= Hamiltonian constraint of LQG =

Constraint in loop quantum gravity

In the ADM formulation of general relativity one splits spacetime into spatial slices and time, the basic variables are taken to be the induced metric, $q_{ab} (x)$, on the spatial slice (the distance function induced on the spatial slice by the spacetime metric), and its conjugate momentum variable related to the extrinsic curvature, $K^{ab} (x)$, (this tells us how the spatial slice curves with respect to spacetime and is a measure of how the induced metric evolves in time). These are the metric canonical coordinates.

Dynamics such as time-evolutions of fields are controlled by the Hamiltonian constraint.

The identity of the Hamiltonian constraint is a major open question in quantum gravity, as is extracting of physical observables from any such specific constraint.

In 1986 Abhay Ashtekar introduced a new set of canonical variables, Ashtekar variables to represent an unusual way of rewriting the metric canonical variables on the three-dimensional spatial slices in terms of a SU(2) gauge field and its complementary variable. The Hamiltonian was much simplified in this reformulation. This led to the loop representation of quantum general relativity and in turn loop quantum gravity.

Within the loop quantum gravity representation Thomas Thiemann was able to formulate a mathematically rigorous operator as a proposal as such a constraint. Although this operator defines a complete and consistent quantum theory, doubts have been raised as to the physical reality of this theory due to inconsistencies with classical general relativity (the quantum constraint algebra closes, but it is not isomorphic to the classical constraint algebra of GR, which is seen as circumstantial evidence of inconsistencies definitely not a proof of inconsistencies), and so variants have been proposed.

== Classical expressions for the Hamiltonian ==
=== Metric formulation ===
The idea was to quantize the canonical variables $q_{ab}$ and $\pi^{ab} = \sqrt{q} (K^{ab} - q^{ab} K_c^c)$, making them into operators acting on wavefunctions on the space of 3-metrics, and then to quantize the Hamiltonian (and other constraints). However, this program soon became regarded as dauntingly difficult for various reasons, one being the non-polynomial nature of the Hamiltonian constraint:

$$H = \sqrt{\det (q)} (K_{ab} K^{ab} - (K_a^a)^2 -\;^3R)$$

where $\;^3R$ is the scalar curvature of the three metric $q_{ab} (x)$. Being a non-polynomial expression in the canonical variables and their derivatives it is very difficult to promote to a quantum operator.

=== Expression using Ashtekar variables ===
The configuration variables of Ashtekar's variables behave like an $SU(2)$ gauge field or connection $A_a^i$. Its canonically conjugate momentum $\tilde{E}_i^a$ is the densitized "electric" field or triad (densitized as $\tilde{E}_i^a = \sqrt{\det (q)} E_i^a$). Their connection with gravity is that the densitized triads can be used to reconstruct the spatial metric via

$$\det (q) q^{ab} = \tilde{E}_i^a \tilde{E}_j^b \delta^{ij}$$.

The densitized triads are not unique, and in fact one can perform a local in space rotation with respect to the internal indices $i$. This is actually the origin of the $SU(2)$ gauge invariance. The connection can be used to reconstruct the extrinsic curvature. The relation is given by

$$A_a^i = \Gamma_a^i - i K_a^i$$

where $\Gamma_a^i$ is related to the spin connection, $\Gamma_{a \;\; i}^{\;\; j}$, by $\Gamma_a^i = \Gamma_{ajk} \epsilon^{jki}$ and $K_a^i = K_{ab} \tilde{E}^{ai} / \sqrt{\det (q)}$.

In terms of Ashtekar variables, the classical expression of the constraint is given by

$$H = {\epsilon_{ijk} F_{ab}^k \tilde{E}_i^a \tilde{E}_j^b  \over \sqrt{\det (q)}}$$.

where $F_{ab}^k$ field strength tensor of the gauge field $A_a^i$ . Due to the factor $1 / \sqrt{\det (q)}$ this is non-polynomial in the Ashtekar's variables. Since we impose the condition

$$H = 0$$,

we could consider the densitized Hamiltonian $\tilde{H}$ instead:

$$\tilde{H} = \sqrt{\det (q)} H = \epsilon_{ijk} F_{ab}^k \tilde{E}_i^a \tilde{E}_j^b = 0$$.

This Hamiltonian is now polynomial in the Ashtekar's variables. This development raised new hopes for the canonical quantum gravity programme. Although Ashtekar variables have the virtue of simplifying the Hamiltonian, it has the problem that the variables become complex numbers. When one quantizes the theory, it is a difficult task to ensure that one recovers real general relativity as opposed to complex general relativity. There are also serious difficulties promoting the densitized Hamiltonian to a quantum operator.

A way of addressing the problem of reality conditions was noting that if we took the signature to be $(+,+,+,+)$, that is Euclidean instead of Lorentzian, then one can retain the simple form of the Hamiltonian for but for real variables. One can then define what is called a generalized Wick rotation to recover the Lorentzian theory. It is a Wick transformation in phase space and has nothing to do with analytical continuation of the time parameter $t$.

=== Expression for real formulation of Ashtekar variables ===
Thomas Thiemann was able to address both the above problems. He used the real connection

$$A_a^i = \Gamma_a^i + \beta K_a^i$$

In real Ashtekar variables the full Hamiltonian is

$$H = - \zeta \frac{\epsilon_{ijk} F_{ab}^k \tilde{E}_i^a \tilde{E}_j^b}{\sqrt{\det (q)}} + 2 {\zeta \beta^2 - 1 \over \beta^2} \frac{(\tilde{E}_i^a \tilde{E}_j^b - \tilde{E}_j^a \tilde{E}_i^b)}{\sqrt{\det (q)}} (A_a^i - \Gamma_a^i) (A_b^j - \Gamma_b^j) = H_E + H'$$.

where the constant $\beta$ is the Barbero-Immirzi parameter. The constant $\zeta$ is -1 for Lorentzian signature and +1 for Euclidean signature. The $\Gamma_a^i$ have a complicated relationship with the densitized triads and causes serious problems upon quantization. Ashtekar variables can be seen as choosing $\beta = i$ to make the second more complicated term was made to vanish (the first term is denoted $H_E$ because for the Euclidean theory this term remains for the real choice of $\beta = \pm 1$). Also we still have the problem of the $1 / \sqrt{\det (q)}$ factor.

Thiemann was able to make it work for real $\beta$. First he could simplify the troublesome $1 / \sqrt{\det (q)}$ by using the identity

$$\{ A_c^k , V \} = {\epsilon_{abc} \epsilon^{ijk} \tilde{E}_i^a \tilde{E}_j^b \over \sqrt{\det (q)}}$$

where $V$ is the volume,

$$V = \int d^3 x \sqrt{\det (q)} = {1 \over 6} \int d^3 x \sqrt{|\tilde{E}_i^a \tilde{E}_j^b \tilde{E}_k^c \epsilon^{ijk} \epsilon_{abc}|}$$.

The first term of the Hamiltonian constraint becomes

$$H_E = \{ A_c^k , V \} F_{ab}^k \tilde{\epsilon}^{abc}$$

upon using Thiemann's identity. This Poisson bracket is replaced by a commutator upon quantization. It turns out that a similar trick can be used to teat the second term. Why are the $\Gamma_a^i$ given by the densitized triads $\tilde{E}^a_i$? It comes about from the compatibility condition

$$D_a E_b^i = 0$$.

We can solve this in much the same way as the Levi-Civita connection can be calculated from the equation $\nabla_c g_{ab} = 0$; by rotating the various indices and then adding and subtracting them (see article spin connection for more details of the derivation, although there we use slightly different notation). We then rewrite this in terms of the densitized triad using that $\det (\tilde{E}) = |\det (E)|^2$. The result is complicated and non-linear, but a homogeneous function of $\tilde{E}_i^a$ of order zero,

$$\Gamma_a^i = {1 \over 2} \epsilon^{ijk} \tilde{E}_k^b [\tilde{E}^j_{a,b} - \tilde{E}^j_{b,a} + \tilde{E}_j^c \tilde{E}_a^l \tilde{E}^l_{c,b}] + {1 \over 4} \epsilon^{ijk} \tilde{E}_k^b \Big[ 2 \tilde{E}_a^j {(\det (\tilde{E}))_{,b} \over \det (\tilde{E})} - \tilde{E}_b^j {(\det (\tilde{E}))_{,a} \over \det (\tilde{E})}  \Big]$$.

To circumvent the problems introduced by this complicated relationship Thiemann first defines the Gauss gauge invariant quantity

$$K = \int d^3 x K_a^i \tilde{E}_i^a$$

where $K_a^i = K_{ab} \tilde{E}^{ai} / \sqrt{\det (q)}$, and notes that

$$K_a^i = \{ A_a^i , K \}$$.

(this is because $\{ \Gamma_a^i , K \} = 0$ which comes about from the fact that $\beta K$ is the generator of the canonical transformation of constant rescaling, $\tilde{E}_i^a \mapsto \tilde{E}_i^a / \beta$, and $\Gamma_a^i$ is a homogeneous function of order zero). We are then able to write

$$A_a^i - \Gamma_a^i = \beta K_a^i = \beta \{ A_a^i , K \}$$

and as such find an expression in terms of the configuration variable $A_a^i$ and $K$ for the second term of the Hamiltonian

$$H' = \epsilon^{abc} \epsilon_{ijk} \{ A_a^i , K \} \{ A_b^j , K \} \{ A_c^k , V \}$$.

Why is it easier to quantize $K$? This is because it can be rewritten in terms of quantities that we already know how to quantize. Specifically $K$ can be rewritten as

$$K = - \{ V , \int d^3 x H_E \}$$

where we have used that the integrated densitized trace of the extrinsic curvature is the``time derivative of the volume".

== Coupling to matter ==
=== Coupling to scalar field ===
The Lagrangian for a scalar field in curved spacetime

$$L = - \int d^4 x \sqrt{- \det (g)} (- g^{\mu \nu} \partial_\mu \varphi \partial_\nu \varphi - V (\varphi))$$.

where $\mu, \nu$ are spacetime indices. We define the conjugate momentum of the scalar field with the usual $\tilde{\pi} = \delta L / \delta \dot{\varphi}$, the Hamiltonian can be rewritten as,

$$H = \int d^3x N \left( {\tilde{\pi}^2 \over \sqrt{\det (q)}} + \sqrt{\det (q)} (q^{ab} \partial_a \varphi \partial_b \varphi +  V (\varphi)) \right) + N^a \tilde{\pi} \partial_a \varphi$$,

where $N$ and $N^a$ are the lapse and shift. In Ashtekar variables this reads,

$$H = \int d^3x { N \over \sqrt{\det (q)} } \left( \tilde{\pi}^2 + \tilde{E}_i^a \tilde{E}^{bi} \partial_a \varphi \partial_b \varphi + \det (q) V (\varphi) \right) + N^a \tilde{\pi} \partial_a \varphi$$

As usual the (smeared) spatial diffeomorphisn constraint is associated with the shift function $N^a$ and the (smeared) Hamiltonian is associated with the lapse function $N$. So we simply read off the spatial diffeomorphism and Hamiltonian constraint,

$$C (\vec{N})_\varphi = \int d^3x N^a \tilde{\pi} \partial_a \varphi$$

$$H (N)_\varphi  = \int d^3x { N \over \sqrt{\det (q)} } \left(  \tilde{\pi}^2 + \tilde{E}_i^a \tilde{E}^{bi} \partial_a \varphi \partial_b \varphi + \det (q) V (\varphi) \right)$$.

These should be added (multiplied by $8 \pi G \beta$) to the spatial diffeomorphism and Hamiltonian constraint of the gravitational field, respectively. This represents the coupling of scalar matter to gravity.

=== Coupling to Fermionic field ===
There are problems coupling gravity to spinor fields: there are no finite-dimensional spinor representations of the general covariance group. However, there are of course spinorial representations of the Lorentz group. This fact is utilized by employing tetrad fields describing a flat tangent space at every point of spacetime. The Dirac matrices $\gamma^I$ are contracted onto vierbeins,

$\gamma^I e_I^a (x) = \gamma^a (x)$.

We wish to construct a generally covariant Dirac equation. Under a flat tangent space Lorentz transformation transforms the spinor as

$\psi \mapsto e^{i \epsilon^{IJ} (x) \sigma_{IJ}} \psi$

We have introduced local Lorentz transformations on flat tangent space, so $\epsilon_{IJ}$ is a function of space-time. This means that the partial derivative of a spinor is no longer a genuine tensor. As usual, one introduces a connection field $\omega_\mu^{IJ}$ that allows us to gauge the Lorentz group. The covariant derivative defined with the spin connection is,

$\nabla_a \psi = (\partial_a - {i \over 4} \omega_a^{IJ} \sigma_{IJ}) \psi$,

and is a genuine tensor and Dirac's equation is rewritten as

$(i \gamma^a \nabla_a - m) \psi = 0$.

The Dirac action in covariant form is

$S_{Dirac} = {1 \over 2} \int_\mathcal{M} d^4 x \sqrt{- det (g)} [\overline{\Psi} \gamma^I E_I^a \nabla_a \Psi - \overline{\nabla_a \Psi} \gamma^I E_I^a \Psi]$

where $\Psi = (\psi , \eta)$ is a Dirac bi-spinor and $\overline{\Psi} = (\Psi^*)^T \gamma^0$ is its conjugate. The covariant derivative $\nabla_a$ is defined to annihilate the tetrad $E_a^I$.

=== Coupling to Electromagnetic field ===
The action for an electromagnetic field in curved spacetime is

$$L = - \int d^4 x \sqrt{- \det (g)} (g^{\mu \alpha} g^{\nu \beta} \mathcal{F}_{\mu \nu} \mathcal{F}_{\alpha \beta})$$

where

$\mathcal{F}^{\mu \nu} = \nabla^\mu \mathcal{A}^\nu - \nabla^\nu \mathcal{A}^\mu$

is the field strength tensor, in components

$\mathcal{F}^{0a} = \mathcal{E}^a$

and $\mathcal{F}^{ab} = \epsilon^{abc} B_c$

where the electric field is given by

$\mathcal{E}^a = - \nabla_a \mathcal{A}_0 - \dot{\mathcal{A}}_a$

and the magnetic field is.

$B^a = \epsilon^{abc} \nabla_b \mathcal{A}_c$.

The classical analysis with the Maxwell action followed by canonical formulation using the time gauge parametrisation results in:

$H (N,N^a,\Lambda) = {1 \over 2} \int_\Sigma d^3 x N {q_{ab} \over \sqrt{det (q)}} [\tilde{\mathcal{E}}^a \tilde{\mathcal{E}}^b + B^a B^b] + N^a \mathcal{F}_{ab} \tilde{\mathcal{E}}^a + \Lambda \nabla_a \tilde{\mathcal{E}}^a$

$B^a = \epsilon^{abc} B_c \qquad \qquad \tilde{\mathcal{E}}^a = - \sqrt{q} N \mathcal{F}^{0a}$

with $\mathcal{A}_a$ and $\tilde{\mathcal{E}}^a$ being the canonical coordinates.

=== Coupling to Yang–Mills field ===
The action for a Yang–Mills field for some compact gauge group $G$ in curved spacetime is

$$L = - \int d^4 x \sqrt{- \det (g)} (g^{\mu \alpha} g^{\nu \beta} \mathcal{F}_{\mu \nu}^I \mathcal{F}_{\alpha \beta}^J \delta_{IJ})$$

where $F$ is the curvature of some $G-$connection. For the standard model $U(1) \times SU(2) \times SU(3)$.

$H = {1 \over 2} \int_\Sigma d^3 x {q_{ab} \over \sqrt{det (q)}} [\tilde{\mathcal{E}}^a_I \tilde{\mathcal{E}}^b_I + B^a_I B^b_I]$

=== Total Hamiltonian of matter coupled to gravity ===
The dynamics of the coupled gravity-matter system is simply defined by the adding of terms defining the matter dynamics to the gravitational hamiltonian. The full hamiltonian is described by

$H = H_{Einstein} + H_{Maxwell} + H_{Yang-Mills} + H_{Dirac} + H_{Higgs}$.

== Quantum Hamiltonian constraint ==
In this section we discuss the quantization of the hamiltonian of pure gravity, that is in the absence of matter. The case of inclusion of matter is discussed in the next section.

The constraints in their primitive form are rather singular, and so should be `smeared' by appropriate test functions. The Hamiltonian is the written as

$$H (N) = \int d^3 x N \{ A_c^k , V \} F_{ab}^k \epsilon^{abc}$$.

For simplicity we are only considering the "Euclidean" part of the Hamiltonian constraint, extension to the full constraint can be found in the literature. There are actually many different choices for functions, and so what one then ends up with an (smeared) Hamiltonians constraints. Demanding them all to vanish is equivalent to the original description.

=== The loop representation ===
The Wilson loop is defined as

$$h_\gamma [A] = \mathcal{P} \exp \left\{ - \int_{s_0}^{s_1} ds \dot{\gamma}^a A_a^i (\gamma (s)) T_i \right\}$$

where $\mathcal{P}$ indicates a path ordering so that factors for smaller values of $s$ appear to the left, and where the $T_i$ satisfy the $su(2)$ algebra,

$$[T^i , T^j] = 2 i \epsilon^{ijk} T^k$$.

It is easy to see from this that,

$$Tr (T^i T^j) - Tr (T^j T^i) = 2 i \epsilon^{ijk} Tr (T^k)$$.

implies that $Tr (T^i) = 0$.

Wilson loops are not independent of each other, and in fact certain linear combinations of them called spin network states form an orthonormal basis. As spin network functions form a basis we can formally expand any Gauss gauge invariant function as,

$$\Psi [A] = \sum_\gamma \Psi [\gamma] s_\gamma [A]$$.

This is called the inverse loop transform. The loop transform is given by

$$\Psi [\gamma] = \int [dA] \Psi [A] s_\gamma [A]$$

and is analogous to what one does when one goes over to the momentum representation in quantum mechanics,

$$\psi [x] = \int dk \psi (k) \exp (ikx)$$.

The loop transform defines the loop representation. Given an operator $\hat{O}$ in the connection representation,

$$\Phi [A] = \hat{O} \Psi [A]$$,

we define $\Phi [\gamma]$ by the loop transform,

$$\Phi [\gamma] = \int [dA] \Phi [A] s_\gamma [A]$$.

This implies that one should define the corresponding operator $\hat{O}'$ on $\Psi [\gamma]$ in the loop representation as

$$\hat{O}' \Psi [\gamma] = \int [dA] s_\gamma [A] \hat{O} \Psi [A]$$,

or

$$\hat{O}' \Psi [\gamma] = \int [dA] (\hat{O}^\dagger s_\gamma [A]) \Psi [A]$$,

where by $\hat{O}^\dagger$ we mean the operator $\hat{O}$ but with the reverse factor ordering. We evaluate the action of this operator on the spin network as a calculation in the connection representation and rearranging the result as a manipulation purely in terms of loops (one should remember that when considering the action on the spin network one should choose the operator one wishes to transform with the opposite factor ordering to the one chosen for its action on wavefunctions $\Psi [A]$). This gives the physical meaning of the operator $\hat{O}'$. For example, if $\hat{O}^\dagger$ were a spatial diffeomorphism, then this can be thought of as keeping the connection field $A$ of the $s_\gamma [A]$ where it is while performing a spatial diffeomorphism on $\gamma$ instead. Therefore, the meaning of $\hat{O}'$ is a spatial diffeomorphism on $\gamma$, the argument of $\Psi [\gamma]$.

The holonomy operator in the loop representation is the multiplication operator,

$$\hat{h}_\gamma \Psi [\eta] = h_\gamma \Psi [\eta]$$

=== Promotion of the Hamiltonian constraint to a quantum operator ===
We promote the Hamiltonian constraint to a quantum operator in the loop representation. One introduces a lattice regularization procedure. we assume that space has been divided into tetrahedra $\Delta$. One builds an expression such that the limit in which the tetrahedra shrink in size approximates the expression for the Hamiltonian constraint.

For each tetrahedron pick a vertex and call $v (\Delta)$. Let $s_i (\Delta)$ with $i = 1,2,3$ be three edges ending at $v (\Delta)$. We now construct a loop

$$\alpha_{ij} = s_i (\Delta) \cdot s_{ij} (\Delta) \cdot s_j (\Delta)^{-1}$$

by moving along $s_i (\Delta)$ then along the line joining the points $s_i$ and $s_j$ that are not $v (\Delta)$ (which we have denoted $s_{ij}$) and then returning to $v (\Delta)$ along $s_j$. The holonomy

$$h_\gamma [A] = \mathcal{P} \exp \left\{ - \int_{s_0}^{s_1} ds \dot{\gamma}^a A_a^i (\gamma (s)) T_i \right\} \approx I - (s_k^a) A_a^i T_i$$

along a line in the limit the tetrahedron shrinks approximates the connection via

$$\lim_{\Delta  \rightarrow v (\Delta)} h_{s_k} = I - A_c s_k^c$$

where $s_k^c$ is a vector in the direction of edge $s_k$. It can be shown that

$$\lim_{\Delta v \rightarrow (\Delta)} h_{\alpha_{ij}} = I + {1 \over 2} F_{ab} s_i^a s_j^b$$.

(this expresses the fact that the field strength tensor, or curvature, measures the holonomy around `infinitesimal loops'). We are led to trying

$$H_\Delta (N) = \sum_\Delta N(v(\Delta)) \epsilon^{ijk} Tr \big( h_{\alpha_{ij}} h_{s_k} \{ h_{s_k}^{-1} , V \} \big)$$

where the sum is over all tetrahedra $\Delta$. Substituting for the holonomies,

$$H_\Delta (N) = \sum_\Delta N(v(\Delta)) \epsilon^{ijk} Tr \big( (I + {1 \over 2} F_{ab} s_i^a s_j^b) (I - A_c s_k^c) \{ (I + A_d s_k^d) , V \} \big)$$.

The identity will have vanishing Poisson bracket with the volume, so the only contribution will come from the connection. As the Poisson bracket is already proportional to $s_k^c$ only the identity part of the holonomy $h_{s_k}$ outside the bracket contributes. Finally we have that the holonomy around $\alpha_{ij}$; the identity term doesn't contribute as the Poisson bracket is proportional to a Pauli matrix (since $A_c = A_c^i T_i$ and the constant matrix $T_i$ can be taken outside the Poisson bracket) and one is taking the trace. The remaining term of $h_{\alpha_{ij}}$ yields the $F_{ab}$. The three lengths $s$'s that appear combine with the summation in the limit to produce an integral.

This expression immediately can be promoted to an operator in the loop representation, both holonomies and volume promote to well defined operators there.

The triangulation is chosen to so as to be adapted to the spin network state one is acting on by choosing the vertices an lines appropriately. There will be many lines and vertices of the triangulation that do not correspond to lines and vertices of the spin network when one takes the limit. Due to the presence of the volume the Hamiltonian constraint will only contribute when there are at least three non-coplanar lines of a vertex.

Here we have only considered the action of the Hamiltonian constraint on trivalent vertices. Computing the action on higher valence vertices is more complicated. We refer the reader to the article by Borissov, De Pietri, and Rovelli.

=== A finite theory ===
The Hamiltonian is not invariant under spatial diffeomorphisms and therefore its action can only be defined on the kinematic space. One can transfer its action to diffeomorphsm invariant states. As we will see this has implications for where precisely the new line is added. Consider a state $\langle\Psi |$ such that $\langle\Psi , s\rangle = \langle\Psi , s'\rangle$ if the spin networks $s$ and $s'$ are diffeomorphic to each other. Such a state is not in the kinematic space but belongs to the larger dual space of a dense subspace of the kinematic space. We then define the action of $\hat{H} (N)$ in the following way,

$$\langle\hat{H} (N) \Psi , s\rangle = \lim_{\Delta \rightarrow v} \sum_\Delta \langle\Psi , \hat{H}_\Delta (N) s\rangle$$.

The position of the added line is then irrelevant. When one projects on $\Psi$ the position of the line does not matter because one is working on the space of diffeomorphism invariant states and so the line can be moved "closer" or "further" from the vertex without changing the result.

Spatial diffeomorphism plays a crucial role in the construction. If the functions were not diffeomorphism invariant, the added line would have to be shrunk to the vertex and possible divergences could appear.

The same construction can be applied to the Hamiltonian of general relativity coupled to matter: scalar fields, Yang–Mills fields, fermions. In all cases the theory is finite, anomaly free and well defined. Gravity appears to be acting as a "fundamental regulator" of theories of matter.

=== Anomaly free ===
Quantum anomalies occur when the quantum constraint algebra has additional terms that don't have classical counterparts. In order to recover the correct semi classical theory these extra terms need to vanish, but this implies additional constraints and reduces the number of degrees of freedom of the theory making it unphysical. Theimann's Hamiltonian constraint can be shown to be anomaly free.

=== The kernel of the Hamiltonian constraint ===
The kernel is the space of states which the Hamiltonian constraint annihilates. One can outline an explicit construction of the complete and rigorous kernel of the proposed operator. They are the first with non-zero volume and which do not need non-zero cosmological constant.

The complete space of solutions to the spatial diffeomorphism $C^a (x) = 0$ for all $x \in \Sigma$ constraints has already been found long ago. And even was equipped with a natural inner product induced from that of the kinematical Hilbert space $\mathcal{H}_{Kin}$ of solutions to the Gauss constraint. However, there is no chance to define the Hamiltonian constraint operators corresponding to $H (x)$ (densely) on $\mathcal{H}_{Diff}$ because the Hamiltonian constraint operators do not preserve spatial diffeomorphism invariant states. Hence one cannot simply solve the spatial diffeomorphisms constraint and then the Hamiltonian constraint and so the inner product structure of $\mathcal{H}_{Diff}$ cannot be employed in the construction of the physical inner product. This problem can be circumvented with the use of the Master constraint (see below) allowing the just mentioned results to be applied to obtain the physical Hilbert space $\mathcal{H}_{Phys}$ from $\mathcal{H}_{Diff}$.

More to come here...

=== Criticisms of the Hamiltonian constraint ===
Recovering the constraint algebra. Classically we have

$$\{ H(N) , H(M) \} = C (\vec{K})$$

where

$$K^a = \tilde{E}_i^a \tilde{E}^{bi} (N \partial_b M - M \partial_b N) / (\det (q))$$

As we know in the loop representation a self-adjoint operator generating spatial diffeomorphisms. Therefore, it is not possible to implement the relation $\{ H (N) , H(M) \}$ for in the quantum theory with infinitesimal $\vec{C}$, it is at most possible with finite spatial dffeomoephisms.

Ultra locality of the Hamiltonian: The Hamiltonian only acts at vertices and acts by "dressing" the vertex with lines. It does not interconnect vertices nor change the valences of the lines (outside the "dressing"). The modifications that the Hamiltonian constraint operator performs at a given vertex do not propagate over the whole graph but are confined to a neighbourhood of the vertex. In fact, repeated action of the Hamiltonian generates more and more new edges ever closer to the vertex never intersecting each other. In particular there is no action at the new vertices created. This implies, for instance, that for surfaces that enclose a vertex (diffeomorphically invariantly defined) the area of such surfaces would commute with the Hamiltonian, implying no "evolution" of these areas as it is the Hamiltonian that generates "evolution". This hints at the theory ``failing to propagate". However, Thiemann points out that the Hamiltonian acts every where.

There is the somewhat subtle matter that the $\hat{H} (x)$, while defined on the Hilbert space $\mathcal{H}_{Kin}$ are not explicitly known (they are known up to a spatial diffeomorphism; they exist by the axiom of choice).

These difficulties could be addressed by a new approach - the Master constraint programme.

== Extension of Quantisation to Inclusion of Matter Fields ==
=== Maxwell's theory ===
Note that $\tilde{\mathcal{E}}^a , B^a$ are both of density weight 1. As usual, before quantisation, we need to express the constraints (and other observables) in terms of the holonomies and fluxes.

We have a common factor of $q_{ab} / \sqrt{q}$. As before, we introduce a cell decomposition and noting,

${q_{ab} \over \sqrt{q}} (x) \propto \delta_{ij} \{ A_a^i (x) , \sqrt{V} \} \{ A_b^j (x) , \sqrt{V} \}$.

=== Yang–Mills ===
Apart from the non-Abelian nature of the gauge field, in form, the expressions proceed in the same manner as for the Maxwell case.

=== Scalar field - Higgs field ===
The elementary configuration operators are analogous of the holonomy operator for connection variables and they act by multiplication as

$\hat{h} (x,\lambda) \Psi = e^{i \lambda \varphi (x)} \Psi$.

These are called point holonomies. The conjugate variable to the point holonomy which is promoted to an operator in the quantum theory, is taken to be the smeared field momentum

$P (f) = \int d^3x \pi_\varphi (x) f (x)$

where $\pi_\varphi$ is the conjugate momentum field and $f (x)$ is a test function. Their Poisson bracket is given by

$\{ h (x,\lambda) , P (f) \} = i \lambda f(x) h (x,\lambda)$.

In the quantum theory one looks for a representation of the Poisson bracket as a commutator of the elementary operators,

$[ \hat{h} (x,\lambda) , \hat{P} (f) ] = i \lambda f(x) \hat{h} (x,\lambda)$.

=== Finiteness of Theory with the Inclusion of Matter ===
Thiemann has illustrated how the ultraviolet diverges of ordinary quantum theory can be directly interpreted as a consequence of the approximation that disregards the quantised, discrete, nature of quantum geometry. For instance Thiemann shows how the operator for the Yang–Mills Hamiltonian involving $E^i_a$ is well defined so long as we treat $E$ as an operator, but becomes infinite as soon as we replace $E$ with a smooth background field.

== The Master constraint programme ==
=== The Master constraint ===
The Master Constraint Programme for Loop Quantum Gravity (LQG) was proposed as a classically equivalent way to impose the infinite number of Hamiltonian constraint equations

$$H (x) = 0$$

in terms of a single Master constraint,

$$M = \int d^3x {[H (x)]^2 \over \sqrt{\det q (x)}}$$.

which involves the square of the constraints in question. Note that $H (x)$ were infinitely many whereas the Master constraint is only one. It is clear that if $M$ vanishes then so do the infinitely many $H (x)$'s. Conversely, if all the $H (x)$'s vanish then so does $M$, therefore they are equivalent.

The Master constraint $M$ involves an appropriate averaging over all space and so is invariant under spatial diffeomorphisms (it is invariant under spatial "shifts" as it is a summation over all such spatial "shifts" of a quantity that transforms as a scalar). Hence its Poisson bracket with the (smeared) spatial diffeomorphism constraint, $C (\vec{N})$, is simple:

$$\{ M  , C (\vec{N}) \} = 0$$.

(it is $su (2)$ invariant as well). Also, obviously as any quantity Poisson commutes with itself, and the Master constraint being a single constraint, it satisfies

$$\{ M  , M \} = 0$$.

We also have the usual algebra between spatial diffeomorphisms. This represents a dramatic simplification of the Poisson bracket structure.

=== Promotion to quantum operator ===
Let us write the classical expression in the form

$$M = \int d^3x {H(x)^2 \over \sqrt{\det (q)} (x)} = \int d^3x ({H \over [\det (q)]^{1/4}})(x) \int d^3y \delta (x,y) ({H \over [\det (q)]^{1/4}}) (y)$$.

This expression is regulated by a one parameter function $\chi_\epsilon (x,y)$ such that $\lim_{\epsilon \rightarrow 0} \chi_\epsilon (x,y) / \epsilon^3 = \delta (x,y)$ and $\chi_\epsilon (x,x) = 1$. Define

$$V_{\epsilon , x} = \int d^3y \chi_\epsilon (x,y) \sqrt{\det (q)} (y)$$.

Both terms will be similar to the expression for the Hamiltonian constraint except now it will involve $\{ A , \sqrt{V_\epsilon} \}$ rather than $\{ A , V \}$ which comes from the additional factor $[\det (q)]^{1/4}$. That is,

$$M = \int d^3 x \epsilon^{abc} \{ A_c^k , \sqrt{V}_\epsilon \} F_{ab}^k (x) \int d^3 y \chi_\epsilon (x,y) \epsilon^{a'b'c'} \{ A_{c'}^{k'} , \sqrt{V}_\epsilon \} F_{a'b'}^{k'} (y)$$.

Thus we proceed exactly as for the Hamiltonian constraint and introduce a partition into tetrahedra, splitting both integrals into sums,

$$M = \lim_{\epsilon \rightarrow 0} \sum_{\Delta , \Delta'} \chi (v (\Delta) , v (\Delta')) \overline{C_\epsilon (\Delta)} C_\epsilon (\Delta')$$.

where the meaning of $C_\epsilon (\Delta)$ is similar to that of $H_\Delta$. This is a huge simplification as $C_\epsilon (\Delta)$ can be quantized precisely as the $H_\Delta$ with a simple change in the power of the volume operator. However, it can be shown that graph-changing, spatially diffeomorphism invariant operators such as the Master constraint cannot be defined on the kinematic Hilbert space $\mathcal{H}_{Kin}$. The way out is to define $\hat{M}$ not on $\mathcal{H}_{Kin}$ but on $\mathcal{H}_{Diff}$.

What is done first is, we are able to compute the matrix elements of the would-be operator $\hat{M}$, that is, we compute the quadratic form $Q_M$. We would like there to be a unique, positive, self-adjoint operator $\hat{M}$ whose matrix elements reproduce $Q_M$. It has been shown that such an operator exists and is given by the Friedrichs extension.

=== Solving the Master constraint and inducing the physical Hilbert space ===
As mentioned above one cannot simply solve the spatial diffeomorphism constraint and then the Hamiltonian constraint, inducing a physical inner product from the spatial diffeomorphism inner product, because the Hamiltonian constraint maps spatially diffeomorphism invariant states onto non-spatial diffeomorphism invariant states. However, as the Master constraint $M$ is spatially diffeomorphism invariant it can be defined on $\mathcal{H}_{Diff}$. Therefore, we are finally able to exploit the full power of the results mentioned above in obtaining $\mathcal{H}_{Diff}$ from $\mathcal{H}_{Kin}$.
