= Spin foam =

Topological structure in loop quantum gravity

In physics, the topological structure of spinfoam or spin foam consists of two-dimensional faces representing a configuration required by functional integration to obtain a Feynman's path integral description of quantum gravity. These structures are employed in loop quantum gravity as a version of quantum foam.

== In loop quantum gravity ==
The covariant formulation of loop quantum gravity provides the best formulation of the dynamics of the theory of quantum gravity – a quantum field theory where the invariance under diffeomorphisms of general relativity applies. The resulting path integral represents a sum over all the possible configurations of spin foam.

=== Spin network ===
A spin network is a two-dimensional graph, together with labels on its vertices and edges which encode aspects of a spatial geometry.

A spin network is defined as a diagram like the Feynman diagram which makes a basis of connections between the elements of a differentiable manifold for the Hilbert spaces defined over them, and for computations of amplitudes between two different hypersurfaces of the manifold. Any evolution of the spin network provides a spin foam over a manifold of one dimension higher than the dimensions of the corresponding spin network. A spin foam is analogous to quantum history.

=== Spacetime ===
Spin networks provide a language to describe the quantum geometry of space. Spin foam does the same job for spacetime.

Spacetime can be defined as a superposition of spin foams, which is a generalized Feynman diagram where instead of a graph, a higher-dimensional complex is used. In topology this sort of space is called a 2-complex. A spin foam is a particular type of 2-complex, with labels for vertices, edges and faces. The boundary of a spin foam is a spin network, just as in the theory of manifolds, where the boundary of an n-manifold is an (n-1)-manifold.

In loop quantum gravity, the present spin foam theory has been inspired by the Ponzano–Regge model. The idea was introduced by Reisenberger and Rovelli in 1997, and later developed into the Barrett–Crane model. The formulation that is used nowadays is commonly called EPRL after the names of the authors of a series of seminal papers, but the theory has also seen fundamental contributions from the work of many others, such as Laurent Freidel (FK model) and Jerzy Lewandowski (KKL model).

== Definition ==
The summary partition function for a spin foam model is

$Z:=\sum_{\Gamma}w(\Gamma)\left[ \sum_{j_f,i_e}\prod_f A_f(j_f) \prod_e A_e(j_f,i_e)\prod_v A_v(j_f,i_e) \right]$

with:

- a set of 2-complexes $\Gamma$ each consisting out of faces $f$, edges $e$ and vertices $v$. Associated to each 2-complex $\Gamma$ is a weight $w(\Gamma)$
- a set of irreducible representations $j$ which label the faces and intertwiners $i$ which label the edges.
- a vertex amplitude $A_v(j_f,i_e)$ and an edge amplitude $A_e(j_f,i_e)$
- a face amplitude $A_f(j_f)$, for which we almost always have $A_f(j_f)=\dim(j_f)$

== See also ==
- Group field theory
- Lorentz invariance in loop quantum gravity
- String-net liquid
