= Loop quantum gravity =

Theory of quantum gravity merging quantum mechanics and general relativity

Loop quantum gravity (LQG) is a theory of quantum gravity that incorporates matter of the Standard Model into the framework established for the intrinsic quantum gravity case.

It is an attempt to develop a quantum theory of gravity based directly on Albert Einstein's geometric formulation, general relativity. As a theory, LQG postulates that the structure of space and time is composed of finite loops woven into an extremely fine fabric or network. These networks of loops are called spin networks. The evolution of a spin network, or spin foam, has a scale on the order of a Planck length, approximately 10^{−35} meters, and smaller scales are meaningless. Consequently, not just matter, but space itself, prefers an atomic structure.

The areas of research, which involve about 30 research groups worldwide, share the basic physical assumptions and the mathematical description of quantum space. Research has evolved in two directions: the more traditional canonical loop quantum gravity, and the newer covariant loop quantum gravity, called spin foam theory. The most well-developed theory that has been advanced as a direct result of loop quantum gravity is called loop quantum cosmology (LQC). LQC advances the study of the early universe, incorporating the concept of the Big Bang into the broader theory of the Big Bounce, which envisions the Big Bang as the beginning of a period of expansion, that follows a period of contraction, which has been described as the Big Crunch.

== History ==
In 1986, Abhay Ashtekar reformulated Einstein's general relativity in a language closer to that of the rest of fundamental physics, specifically Yang–Mills theory. Shortly after, Ted Jacobson and Lee Smolin realized that the formal equation of quantum gravity, called the Wheeler–DeWitt equation, admitted solutions labelled by loops when rewritten in the new Ashtekar variables. Carlo Rovelli and Smolin defined a nonperturbative and background-independent quantum theory of gravity in terms of these loop solutions. Jorge Pullin and Jerzy Lewandowski understood that the intersections of the loops are essential for the consistency of the theory, and the theory should be formulated in terms of intersecting loops, or graphs.

In 1994, Rovelli and Smolin showed that the quantum operators of the theory associated to area and volume have a discrete spectrum. That is, geometry is quantized. This result defines an explicit basis of states of quantum geometry, which turned out to be labelled by Roger Penrose's spin networks, which are graphs labelled by spins.

The canonical version of the dynamics was established by Thomas Thiemann, who defined an anomaly-free Hamiltonian operator and showed the existence of a mathematically consistent background-independent theory. The covariant, or "spin foam", version of the dynamics was developed jointly over several decades by research groups in France, Canada, UK, Poland, and Germany. It was completed in 2008, leading to the definition of a family of transition amplitudes, which in the classical limit can be shown to be related to a family of truncations of general relativity. The finiteness of these amplitudes was proven in 2011. It requires the existence of a positive cosmological constant, which is consistent with observed acceleration in the expansion of the Universe.

== Background independence ==
LQG is formally background independent, meaning the equations of LQG are not embedded in, or dependent on, space and time (except for its invariant topology). Instead, they are expected to give rise to space and time. The issue of background independence in LQG still has some unresolved subtleties. For example, some derivations require a fixed choice of the topology, while any consistent quantum theory of gravity should include topology change as a dynamical process.

Spacetime as a "container" over which physics takes place has no objective physical meaning and instead the gravitational interaction is represented as just one of the fields forming the world. This is known as the relationalist interpretation of spacetime. In LQG this aspect of general relativity is taken seriously and this symmetry is preserved by requiring that the physical states remain invariant under the generators of diffeomorphisms. The interpretation of this condition is well understood for purely spatial diffeomorphisms. However, the understanding of diffeomorphisms involving time (the Hamiltonian constraint) is more subtle because it is related to dynamics and the so-called "problem of time" in general relativity. A generally accepted calculational framework to account for this constraint has yet to be found. A plausible candidate for the quantum Hamiltonian constraint is the operator introduced by Thiemann.

== Constraints and their Poisson bracket algebra ==
=== Dirac observables ===
The constraints define a constraint surface in the original phase space. The gauge motions of the constraints apply to all phase space but have the feature that they leave the constraint surface where it is, and thus the orbit of a point in the hypersurface under gauge transformations will be an orbit entirely within it. Dirac observables are defined as phase space functions, $O$, that Poisson commute with all the constraints when the constraint equations are imposed,
$$\{ G_j , O \}_{G_j=C_a=H = 0} = \{ C_a , O \}_{G_j=C_a=H = 0} = \{ H , O \}_{G_j=C_a=H = 0} = 0,$$
that is, they are quantities defined on the constraint surface that are invariant under the gauge transformations of the theory.

Then, solving only the constraint $G_j = 0$ and determining the Dirac observables with respect to it leads us back to the Arnowitt–Deser–Misner (ADM) phase space with constraints $H, C_a$. The dynamics of general relativity is generated by the constraints, it can be shown that six Einstein equations describing time evolution (really a gauge transformation) can be obtained by calculating the Poisson brackets of the three-metric and its conjugate momentum with a linear combination of the spatial diffeomorphism and Hamiltonian constraint. The vanishing of the constraints, giving the physical phase space, are the four other Einstein equations.

== Quantization of the constraints – the equations of quantum general relativity ==
=== Pre-history and Ashtekar new variables ===
Many of the technical problems in canonical quantum gravity revolve around the constraints. Canonical general relativity was originally formulated in terms of metric variables, but there seemed to be insurmountable mathematical difficulties in promoting the constraints to quantum operators because of their highly non-linear dependence on the canonical variables. The equations were much simplified with the introduction of Ashtekar's new variables. Ashtekar variables describe canonical general relativity in terms of a new pair of canonical variables closer to those of gauge theories. The first step consists of using densitized triads $\tilde{E}_i^a$ (a triad $E_i^a$ is simply three orthogonal vector fields labeled by $i = 1,2,3$ and the densitized triad is defined by $\tilde{E}_i^a = \sqrt{\det (q)} E_i^a$) to encode information about the spatial metric,
$$\det(q) q^{ab} = \tilde{E}_i^a \tilde{E}_j^b \delta^{ij}.$$
(where $\delta^{ij}$ is the flat space metric, and the above equation expresses that $q^{ab}$, when written in terms of the basis $E_i^a$, is locally flat). (Formulating general relativity with triads instead of metrics was not new.) The densitized triads are not unique, and in fact one can perform a local in space rotation with respect to the internal indices $i$. The canonically conjugate variable is related to the extrinsic curvature by $K_a^i = K_{ab} \tilde{E}^{ai} / \sqrt{\det (q)}$. But problems similar to using the metric formulation arise when one tries to quantize the theory. Ashtekar's new insight was to introduce a new configuration variable,
$$A_a^i = \Gamma_a^i - i K_a^i$$
that behaves as a complex $\operatorname{SU}(2)$ connection where $\Gamma_a^i$ is related to the so-called spin connection via $\Gamma_a^i = \Gamma_{ajk} \epsilon^{jki}$. Here $A_a^i$ is called the chiral spin connection. It defines a covariant derivative $\mathcal{D}_a$. It turns out that $\tilde{E}^a_i$ is the conjugate momentum of $A_a^i$, and together these form Ashtekar's new variables.

The expressions for the constraints in Ashtekar variables; Gauss's theorem, the spatial diffeomorphism constraint and the (densitized) Hamiltonian constraint then read:
$$G^i = \mathcal{D}_a \tilde{E}_i^a = 0$$
$$C_a = \tilde{E}_i^b F^i_{ab} - A_a^i (\mathcal{D}_b \tilde{E}_i^b) = V_a - A_a^i G^i = 0,$$
$$\tilde{H} = \epsilon_{ijk} \tilde{E}_i^a \tilde{E}_j^b F^k_{ab} = 0$$
respectively, where $F^i_{ab}$ is the field strength tensor of the connection $A_a^i$ and where $V_a$ is referred to as the vector constraint. The above-mentioned local in space rotational invariance is the original of the $\operatorname{SU}(2)$ gauge invariance here expressed by Gauss's theorem. Note that these constraints are polynomial in the fundamental variables, unlike the constraints in the metric formulation. This dramatic simplification seemed to open up the way to quantizing the constraints. (See the article Self-dual Palatini action for a derivation of Ashtekar's formalism).

With Ashtekar's new variables, given the configuration variable $A^i_a$, it is natural to consider wavefunctions $\Psi (A^i_a)$. This is the connection representation. It is analogous to ordinary quantum mechanics with configuration variable $q$ and wavefunctions $\psi (q)$. The configuration variable gets promoted to a quantum operator via:
$$\hat{A}_a^i \Psi (A) = A_a^i \Psi (A),$$
(analogous to $\hat{q} \psi (q) = q \psi (q)$) and the triads are (functional) derivatives,
$$\hat{\tilde{E_i^a}} \Psi (A) = - i {\delta \Psi (A) \over \delta A_a^i}.$$
(analogous to $\hat{p} \psi (q) = -i \hbar d \psi (q) / dq$). In passing over to the quantum theory the constraints become operators on a kinematic Hilbert space (the unconstrained $\operatorname{SU}(2)$ Yang–Mills Hilbert space). Note that different ordering of the $A$'s and $\tilde{E}$'s when replacing the $\tilde{E}$'s with derivatives give rise to different operators – the choice made is called the factor ordering and should be chosen via physical reasoning. Formally they read
$$\hat{G}_j \vert\psi \rangle = 0$$
$$\hat{C}_a \vert\psi \rangle = 0$$
$$\hat{\tilde{H}} \vert\psi \rangle = 0.$$

There are still problems in properly defining all these equations and solving them. For example, the Hamiltonian constraint Ashtekar worked with was the densitized version instead of the original Hamiltonian, that is, he worked with $\tilde{H} = \sqrt{\det (q)} H$. There were serious difficulties in promoting this quantity to a quantum operator. Moreover, although Ashtekar variables had the virtue of simplifying the Hamiltonian, they are complex. When one quantizes the theory, it is difficult to ensure that one recovers real general relativity as opposed to complex general relativity.

=== Quantum constraints as the equations of quantum general relativity ===
The classical result of the Poisson bracket of the smeared Gauss' law $G(\lambda) = \int d^3x \lambda^j (D_a E^a)^j$ with the connections is
$$\{ G(\lambda), A_a^i \} = \partial_a \lambda^i + g \epsilon^{ijk} A_a^j \lambda^k = (D_a \lambda)^i.$$

The quantum Gauss' law reads
$$\hat{G}_j \Psi (A) = - i D_a {\delta \lambda \Psi [A] \over \delta A_a^j} = 0.$$

If one smears the quantum Gauss' law and study its action on the quantum state one finds that the action of the constraint on the quantum state is equivalent to shifting the argument of $\Psi$ by an infinitesimal (in the sense of the parameter $\lambda$ small) gauge transformation,
$$\left [ 1 + \int d^3x \lambda^j (x) \hat{G}_j \right] \Psi (A) = \Psi [A + D \lambda] = \Psi [A],$$
and the last identity comes from the fact that the constraint annihilates the state. So the constraint, as a quantum operator, is imposing the same symmetry that its vanishing imposed classically: it is telling us that the functions $\Psi [A]$ have to be gauge invariant functions of the connection. The same idea is true for the other constraints.

Therefore, the two step process in the classical theory of solving the constraints $C_I = 0$ (equivalent to solving the admissibility conditions for the initial data) and looking for the gauge orbits (solving the 'evolution' equations) is replaced by a one step process in the quantum theory, namely looking for solutions $\Psi$ of the quantum equations $\hat{C}_I \Psi = 0$. This is because it solves the constraint at the quantum level and it simultaneously looks for states that are gauge invariant because $\hat{C}_I$ is the quantum generator of gauge transformations (gauge invariant functions are constant along the gauge orbits and thus characterize them). Recall that, at the classical level, solving the admissibility conditions and evolution equations was equivalent to solving all of Einstein's field equations, this underlines the central role of the quantum constraint equations in canonical quantum gravity.

=== Introduction of the loop representation ===
It was in particular the inability to have good control over the space of solutions to Gauss's law and spatial diffeomorphism constraints that led Rovelli and Smolin to consider the loop representation in gauge theories and quantum gravity.

LQG includes the concept of a holonomy. A holonomy is a measure of how much the initial and final values of a spinor or vector differ after parallel transport around a closed loop; it is denoted
$$h_\gamma [A] .$$

Knowledge of the holonomies is equivalent to knowledge of the connection, up to gauge equivalence. Holonomies can also be associated with an edge; under a Gauss Law these transform as
$$(h'_e)_{\alpha \beta} = U_{\alpha \gamma}^{-1} (x) (h_e)_{\gamma \sigma} U_{\sigma \beta} (y).$$

For a closed loop $x = y$ and assuming $\alpha = \beta$, yields
$$(h'_e)_{\alpha \alpha} = U_{\alpha \gamma}^{-1} (x) (h_e)_{\gamma \sigma} U_{\sigma \alpha} (x) = [U_{\sigma \alpha} (x) U_{\alpha \gamma}^{-1} (x)] (h_e)_{\gamma \sigma} = \delta_{\sigma \gamma} (h_e)_{\gamma \sigma} = (h_e)_{\gamma \gamma}$$
or
$$\operatorname{Tr} h'_\gamma = \operatorname{Tr} h_\gamma.$$

The trace of an holonomy around a closed loop is written
$$W_\gamma [A]$$
and is called a Wilson loop. Thus Wilson loops are gauge invariant. The explicit form of the Holonomy is
$$h_\gamma [A] = \mathcal{P} \exp \left \{-\int_{\gamma_0}^{\gamma_1} ds \dot{\gamma}^a A_a^i (\gamma (s)) T_i \right \}$$
where $\gamma$ is the curve along which the holonomy is evaluated, and $s$ is a parameter along the curve, $\mathcal{P}$ denotes path ordering meaning factors for smaller values of $s$ appear to the left, and $T_i$ are matrices that satisfy the $\operatorname{SU}(2)$ algebra
$$[T^i ,T^j] = 2i \epsilon^{ijk} T_k.$$

The Pauli matrices satisfy the above relation. It turns out that there are infinitely many more examples of sets of matrices that satisfy these relations, where each set comprises $(N+1) \times (N+1)$ matrices with $N = 1,2,3,\dots$, and where none of these can be thought to 'decompose' into two or more examples of lower dimension. They are called different irreducible representations of the $\operatorname{SU}(2)$ algebra. The most fundamental representation being the Pauli matrices. The holonomy is labelled by a half integer $N/2$ according to the irreducible representation used.

The use of Wilson loops explicitly solves the Gauss gauge constraint. Loop representation is required to handle the spatial diffeomorphism constraint. With Wilson loops as a basis, any Gauss gauge invariant function expands as,
$$\Psi [A] = \sum_\gamma \Psi [\gamma] W_\gamma [A].$$

This is called the loop transform and is analogous to the momentum representation in quantum mechanics (see Position and momentum space). The QM representation has a basis of states $\exp (ikx)$ labelled by a number $k$ and expands as
$$\psi [x] = \int dk \psi (k) \exp (ikx).$$
and works with the coefficients of the expansion $\psi (k).$

The inverse loop transform is defined by
$$\Psi [\gamma] = \int [dA] \Psi [A] W_\gamma [A].$$

This defines the loop representation. Given an operator $\hat{O}$ in the connection representation,
$$\Phi [A] = \hat{O} \Psi [A] \qquad Eq \; 1,$$
one should define the corresponding operator $\hat{O}'$ on $\Psi [\gamma]$ in the loop representation via,
$$\Phi [\gamma] = \hat{O}' \Psi [\gamma] \qquad Eq \; 2,$$
where $\Phi [\gamma]$ is defined by the usual inverse loop transform,
$$\Phi [\gamma] = \int [dA] \Phi [A] W_\gamma [A] \qquad Eq \; 3.$$

A transformation formula giving the action of the operator $\hat{O}'$ on $\Psi [\gamma]$ in terms of the action of the operator $\hat{O}$ on $\Psi [A]$ is then obtained by equating the R.H.S. of $Eq \; 2$ with the R.H.S. of $Eq \; 3$ with $Eq \; 1$ substituted into $Eq \; 3$, namely
$$\hat{O}' \Psi [\gamma] = \int [dA] W_\gamma [A] \hat{O} \Psi [A],$$
or
$$\hat{O}' \Psi [\gamma] = \int [dA] (\hat{O}^\dagger W_\gamma [A]) \Psi [A],$$
where $\hat{O}^\dagger$ means the operator $\hat{O}$ but with the reverse factor ordering (remember from simple quantum mechanics where the product of operators is reversed under conjugation). The action of this operator on the Wilson loop is evaluated as a calculation in the connection representation and the result is rearranged purely as a manipulation in terms of loops (with regard to the action on the Wilson loop, the chosen transformed operator is the one with the opposite factor ordering compared to the one used for its action on wavefunctions $\Psi [A]$). This gives the physical meaning of the operator $\hat{O}'$. For example, if $\hat{O}^\dagger$ corresponded to a spatial diffeomorphism, then this can be thought of as keeping the connection field $A$ of $W_\gamma [A]$ where it is while performing a spatial diffeomorphism on $\gamma$ instead. Therefore, the meaning of $\hat{O}'$ is a spatial diffeomorphism on $\gamma$, the argument of $\Psi [\gamma]$.

In the loop representation, the spatial diffeomorphism constraint is solved by considering functions of loops $\Psi [\gamma]$ that are invariant under spatial diffeomorphisms of the loop $\gamma$. That is, knot invariants are used. This opens up an unexpected connection between knot theory and quantum gravity.

Any collection of non-intersecting Wilson loops satisfy Ashtekar's quantum Hamiltonian constraint. Using a particular ordering of terms and replacing $\tilde{E}^a_i$ by a derivative, the action of the quantum Hamiltonian constraint on a Wilson loop is
$$\hat{\tilde{H}}^\dagger W_\gamma [A] = - \epsilon_{ijk} \hat{F}^k_{ab} \frac{\delta}{\delta A_a^i} \frac{\delta}{\delta A_b^j} W_\gamma [A].$$

When a derivative is taken it brings down the tangent vector, $\dot{\gamma}^a$, of the loop, $\gamma$. So,
$$\hat{F}^i_{ab} \dot{\gamma}^a \dot{\gamma}^b.$$

However, as $F^i_{ab}$ is anti-symmetric in the indices $a$ and $b$ this vanishes (this assumes that $\gamma$ is not discontinuous anywhere and so the tangent vector is unique).

With regard to loop representation, the wavefunctions $\Psi [\gamma]$ vanish when the loop has discontinuities and are knot invariants. Such functions solve the Gauss law, the spatial diffeomorphism constraint and (formally) the Hamiltonian constraint. This yields an infinite set of exact (if only formal) solutions to all the equations of quantum general relativity! This generated a lot of interest in the approach and eventually led to LQG.

=== Geometric operators, the need for intersecting Wilson loops and spin network states ===
The easiest geometric quantity is the area. Let us choose coordinates so that the surface $\Sigma$ is characterized by $x^3 = 0$. The area of small parallelogram of the surface $\Sigma$ is the product of length of each side times $\sin \theta$ where $\theta$ is the angle between the sides. Say one edge is given by the vector $\vec{u}$ and the other by $\vec{v}$ then,
$$A = \| \vec{u} \| \| \vec{v} \| \sin \theta = \sqrt{\| \vec{u} \|^2 \| \vec{v} \|^2 (1 - \cos^2 \theta)} = \sqrt{\| \vec{u} \|^2 \| \vec{v} \|^2 - (\vec{u} \cdot \vec{v})^2}$$

In the space spanned by $x^1$ and $x^2$ there is an infinitesimal parallelogram described by $\vec{u} = \vec{e}_1 dx^1$ and $\vec{v} = \vec{e}_2 dx^2$. Using $q_{AB}^{(2)} = \vec{e}_A \cdot \vec{e}_B$ (where the indices $A$ and $B$ run from 1 to 2), yields the area of the surface $\Sigma$ given by
$$A_\Sigma = \int_\Sigma dx^1 dx^2 \sqrt{\det \left(q^{(2)}\right)}$$
where $\det (q^{(2)}) = q_{11} q_{22} - q_{12}^2$ and is the determinant of the metric induced on $\Sigma$. The latter can be rewritten $\det (q^{(2)}) = \epsilon^{AB} \epsilon^{CD} q_{AC} q_{BD} / 2$ where the indices $A \dots D$ go from 1 to 2. This can be further rewritten as
$$\det (q^{(2)}) = {\epsilon^{3ab} \epsilon^{3cd} q_{ac} q_{bc} \over 2}.$$

The standard formula for an inverse matrix is
$$q^{ab} = {\epsilon^{bcd} \epsilon^{aef} q_{ce} q_{df} \over 2!\det (q)}.$$

There is a similarity between this and the expression for $\det(q^{(2)})$. But in Ashtekar variables, $\tilde{E}^a_i\tilde{E}^{bi} = \det (q) q^{ab}$. Therefore,
$$A_\Sigma = \int_\Sigma dx^1 dx^2 \sqrt{\tilde{E}^3_i \tilde{E}^{3i}}.$$

According to the rules of canonical quantization the triads $\tilde{E}^3_i$ should be promoted to quantum operators,
$$\hat{\tilde{E}}^3_i \sim {\delta \over \delta A_3^i}.$$

The area $A_\Sigma$ can be promoted to a well defined quantum operator despite the fact that it contains a product of two functional derivatives and a square-root. Putting $N = 2J$ ($J$-th representation),
$$\sum_i T^i T^i = J (J+1) 1.$$

This quantity is important in the final formula for the area spectrum. The result is
$$\hat{A}_\Sigma W_\gamma [A] = 8 \pi \ell_{\text{Planck}}^2 \beta \sum_I \sqrt{j_I (j_I + 1)} W_\gamma [A]$$
where the sum is over all edges $I$ of the Wilson loop that pierce the surface $\Sigma$.

The formula for the volume of a region $R$ is given by
$$V = \int_R d^3 x \sqrt{\det (q)} = \int_R dx^3 \sqrt{\frac{1}{3!} \epsilon_{abc} \epsilon^{ijk} \tilde{E}^a_i \tilde{E}^b_j \tilde{E}^c_k}.$$

The quantization of the volume proceeds the same way as with the area. Each time the derivative is taken, it brings down the tangent vector $\dot{\gamma}^a$, and when the volume operator acts on non-intersecting Wilson loops the result vanishes. Quantum states with non-zero volume must therefore involve intersections. Given that the anti-symmetric summation is taken over in the formula for the volume, it needs intersections with at least three non-coplanar lines. At least four-valent vertices are needed for the volume operator to be non-vanishing.

Assuming the real representation where the gauge group is $\operatorname{SU}(2)$, Wilson loops are an over complete basis as there are identities relating different Wilson loops. These occur because Wilson loops are based on matrices (the holonomy) and these matrices satisfy identities. Given any two $\operatorname{SU}(2)$ matrices $\mathbb{A}$ and $\mathbb{B}$,
$$\operatorname{Tr}(\mathbb{A}) \operatorname{Tr}(\mathbb{B}) = \operatorname{Tr}(\mathbb{A}\mathbb{B}) + \operatorname{Tr}(\mathbb{A}\mathbb{B}^{-1}).$$

This implies that given two loops $\gamma$ and $\eta$ that intersect,
$$W_\gamma [A] W_\eta [A] = W_{\gamma \circ \eta} [A] + W_{\gamma \circ \eta^{-1}} [A]$$
where by $\eta^{-1}$ we mean the loop $\eta$ traversed in the opposite direction and $\gamma \circ \eta$ means the loop obtained by going around the loop $\gamma$ and then along $\eta$. See figure below. Given that the matrices are unitary one has that $W_\gamma [A] = W_{\gamma^{-1}} [A]$. Also given the cyclic property of the matrix traces (i.e. $\operatorname{Tr} (\mathbb{A} \mathbb{B}) = \operatorname{Tr}(\mathbb{B} \mathbb{A})$) one has that $W_{\gamma \circ \eta} [A] = W_{\eta \circ \gamma} [A]$. These identities can be combined with each other into further identities of increasing complexity adding more loops. These identities are the so-called Mandelstam identities. Spin networks certain are linear combinations of intersecting Wilson loops designed to address the over-completeness introduced by the Mandelstam identities (for trivalent intersections they eliminate the over-completeness entirely) and actually constitute a basis for all gauge invariant functions.

Graphical representation of the simplest non-trivial Mandelstam identity relating different Wilson loops

As mentioned above the holonomy tells one how to propagate test spin half particles. A spin network state assigns an amplitude to a set of spin half particles tracing out a path in space, merging and splitting. These are described by spin networks $\gamma$: the edges are labelled by spins together with 'intertwiners' at the vertices which are prescription for how to sum over different ways the spins are rerouted. The sum over rerouting are chosen as such to make the form of the intertwiner invariant under Gauss gauge transformations.

=== Hamiltonian constraint of LQG ===
In the long history of canonical quantum gravity, formulating the Hamiltonian constraint as a quantum operator (the Wheeler–DeWitt equation) in a mathematically rigorous manner has been a formidable problem. It was in the loop representation that a mathematically well-defined Hamiltonian constraint was finally formulated in 1996. We leave further details of its construction to the article: Hamiltonian constraint of LQG. This, together with the quantum versions of the Gauss law and spatial diffeomorphism constrains written in the loop representation, are the central equations of LQG (modern canonical quantum General relativity).

Finding the states that are annihilated by these constraints (the physical states), and finding the corresponding physical inner product, and observables is the main goal of the technical side of LQG.

An important aspect of the Hamiltonian operator is that it only acts at vertices (a consequence of this is that Thiemann's Hamiltonian operator, like Ashtekar's operator, annihilates non-intersecting loops except now it is not just formal and has rigorous mathematical meaning). More precisely, its action is non-zero on at least vertices of valence three and greater and results in a linear combination of new spin networks where the original graph has been modified by the addition of lines at each vertex together and a change in the labels of the adjacent links of the vertex.

=== Chiral fermions and the fermion doubling problem ===
A significant challenge in theoretical physics lies in unifying LQG, a theory of quantum spacetime, with the Standard Model of particle physics, which describes fundamental forces and particles. A major obstacle in this endeavor is the fermion doubling problem, which arises when incorporating chiral fermions into the LQG framework.

Chiral fermions, such as electrons and quarks, are fundamental particles characterized by their "handedness" or chirality. This property dictates that a particle and its mirror image behave differently under weak interactions. This asymmetry is fundamental to the Standard Model's success in explaining numerous physical phenomena.

However, attempts to integrate chiral fermions into LQG often result in the appearance of spurious, mirror-image particles. Instead of a single left-handed fermion, for instance, the theory predicts the existence of both a left-handed and a right-handed version. This "doubling" contradicts the observed chirality of the Standard Model and disrupts its predictive power.

The fermion doubling problem poses a significant hurdle in constructing a consistent theory of quantum gravity. The Standard Model's accuracy in describing the universe at the smallest scales relies heavily on the unique properties of chiral fermions. Without a solution to this problem, incorporating matter and its interactions into a unified framework of quantum gravity remains a significant challenge.

== Spin foams ==
In loop quantum gravity (LQG), a spin network represents a "quantum state" of the gravitational field on a 3-dimensional hypersurface. The set of all possible spin networks (or, more accurately, "s-knots" – that is, equivalence classes of spin networks under diffeomorphisms) is countable; it constitutes a basis of LQG Hilbert space.

In physics, a spin foam is a topological structure made out of two-dimensional faces that represents one of the configurations that must be summed to obtain a Feynman's path integral (functional integration) description of quantum gravity. It is closely related to loop quantum gravity.

=== Spin foam derived from the Hamiltonian constraint operator ===
The Hamiltonian constraint generates 'time' evolution. Solving the Hamiltonian constraint should tell us how quantum states evolve in 'time' from an initial spin network state to a final spin network state. One approach to solving the Hamiltonian constraint starts with what is called the Dirac delta function. The summation of which over different sequences of actions can be visualized as a summation over different histories of 'interaction vertices' in the 'time' evolution sending the initial spin network to the final spin network. Each time a Hamiltonian operator acts it does so by adding a new edge at the vertex.

This then naturally gives rise to the two-complex (a combinatorial set of faces that join along edges, which in turn join on vertices) underlying the spin foam description; we evolve forward an initial spin network sweeping out a surface, the action of the Hamiltonian constraint operator is to produce a new planar surface starting at the vertex. We are able to use the action of the Hamiltonian constraint on the vertex of a spin network state to associate an amplitude to each "interaction" (in analogy to Feynman diagrams). See figure below. This opens a way of trying to directly link canonical LQG to a path integral description. Just as a spin networks describe quantum space, each configuration contributing to these path integrals, or sums over history, describe 'quantum spacetime'. Because of their resemblance to soap foams and the way they are labeled John Baez gave these 'quantum spacetimes' the name 'spin foams'.

The action of the Hamiltonian constraint translated to the path integral or so-called spin foam description. A single node splits into three nodes, creating a spin foam vertex. $N (x_n)$ is the value of $N$ at the vertex and $H_{nop}$ are the matrix elements of the Hamiltonian constraint $\hat{H}$.

There are however severe difficulties with this particular approach, for example the Hamiltonian operator is not self-adjoint, in fact it is not even a normal operator (i.e. the operator does not commute with its adjoint) and so the spectral theorem cannot be used to define the exponential in general. The most serious problem is that the $\hat{H} (x)$'s are not mutually commuting, it can then be shown the formal quantity $\int [d N] e^{i \int d^3 x N (x) \hat{H} (x)}$ cannot even define a (generalized) projector. The master constraint (see below) does not suffer from these problems and as such offers a way of connecting the canonical theory to the path integral formulation.

=== Spin foams from BF theory ===
It turns out there are alternative routes to formulating the path integral, however their connection to the Hamiltonian formalism is less clear. One way is to start with the BF theory. This is a simpler theory than general relativity, it has no local degrees of freedom and as such depends only on topological aspects of the fields. BF theory is what is known as a topological field theory. Surprisingly, it turns out that general relativity can be obtained from BF theory by imposing a constraint, BF theory involves a field $B_{ab}^{IJ}$ and if one chooses the field $B$ to be the (anti-symmetric) product of two tetrads
$$B_{ab}^{IJ} = {1 \over 2} \left(E^I_a E^J_b - E^I_b E^J_a\right)$$
(tetrads are like triads but in four spacetime dimensions), one recovers general relativity. The condition that the $B$ field be given by the product of two tetrads is called the simplicity constraint. The spin foam dynamics of the topological field theory is well understood. Given the spin foam 'interaction' amplitudes for this simple theory, one then tries to implement the simplicity conditions to obtain a path integral for general relativity. The non-trivial task of constructing a spin foam model is then reduced to the question of how this simplicity constraint should be imposed in the quantum theory. The first attempt at this was the famous Barrett–Crane model. However this model was shown to be problematic, for example there did not seem to be enough degrees of freedom to ensure the correct classical limit. It has been argued that the simplicity constraint was imposed too strongly at the quantum level and should only be imposed in the sense of expectation values just as with the Lorenz gauge condition $\partial_\mu \hat{A}^\mu$ in the Gupta–Bleuler formalism of quantum electrodynamics. New models have now been put forward, sometimes motivated by imposing the simplicity conditions in a weaker sense.

Another difficulty here is that spin foams are defined on a discretization of spacetime. While this presents no problems for a topological field theory as it has no local degrees of freedom, it presents problems for GR. This is known as the problem triangularization dependence.

=== Modern formulation of spin foams ===
Just as imposing the classical simplicity constraint recovers general relativity from BF theory, it is expected that an appropriate quantum simplicity constraint will recover quantum gravity from quantum BF theory.

Progress has been made with regard to this issue by Engle, Pereira, and Rovelli, Freidel and Krasnov and Livine and Speziale in defining spin foam interaction amplitudes with better behaviour.

An attempt to make contact between EPRL-FK spin foam and the canonical formulation of LQG has been made.

=== Spin foam derived from the master constraint operator ===
See below.

== The semiclassical limit and loop quantum gravity ==
The Classical limit is the ability of a physical theory to approximate classical mechanics. It is used with physical theories that predict non-classical behavior. Any candidate theory of quantum gravity must be able to reproduce Einstein's theory of general relativity as a classical limit of a quantum theory. This is not guaranteed because of a feature of quantum field theories which is that they have different sectors, these are analogous to the different phases that come about in the thermodynamical limit of statistical systems. Just as different phases are physically different, so are different sectors of a quantum field theory. It may turn out that LQG belongs to an unphysical sector – one in which one does not recover general relativity in the semiclassical limit or there might not be any physical sector.

Moreover, the physical Hilbert space $H_{phys}$ must contain enough semiclassical states to guarantee that the quantum theory obtained can return to the classical theory when $\hbar \to 0$ avoiding quantum anomalies; otherwise there will be restrictions on the physical Hilbert space that have no counterpart in the classical theory, implying that the quantum theory has fewer degrees of freedom than the classical theory.

Theorems establishing the uniqueness of the loop representation as defined by Ashtekar et al. (i.e. a certain concrete realization of a Hilbert space and associated operators reproducing the correct loop algebra) have been given by two groups (Lewandowski, Okołów, Sahlmann and Thiemann; and Christian Fleischhack). Before this result was established it was not known whether there could be other examples of Hilbert spaces with operators invoking the same loop algebra – other realizations not equivalent to the one that had been used. These uniqueness theorems imply no others exist, so if LQG does not have the correct semiclassical limit then the theorems would mean the end of the loop representation of quantum gravity.

=== Difficulties and progress checking the semiclassical limit ===
There are a number of difficulties in trying to establish LQG gives Einstein's theory of general relativity in the semiclassical limit:

1. There is no operator corresponding to infinitesimal spatial diffeomorphisms (it is not surprising that the theory has no generator of infinitesimal spatial 'translations' as it predicts spatial geometry has a discrete nature, compare to the situation in condensed matter). Instead it must be approximated by finite spatial diffeomorphisms and so the Poisson bracket structure of the classical theory is not exactly reproduced. This problem can be circumvented with the introduction of the so-called master constraint (see below).
2. There is the problem of reconciling the discrete combinatorial nature of the quantum states with the continuous nature of the fields of the classical theory.
3. There are serious difficulties arising from the structure of the Poisson brackets involving the spatial diffeomorphism and Hamiltonian constraints. In particular, the algebra of (smeared) Hamiltonian constraints does not close: It is proportional to a sum over infinitesimal spatial diffeomorphisms (which, as noted above, does not exist in the quantum theory) where the coefficients of proportionality are not constants but have non-trivial phase space dependence – as such it does not form a Lie algebra. However, the situation is improved by the introduction of the master constraint.
4. The semiclassical machinery developed so far is only appropriate to non-graph-changing operators, however, Thiemann's Hamiltonian constraint is a graph-changing operator – the new graph it generates has degrees of freedom upon which the coherent state does not depend and so their quantum fluctuations are not suppressed. There is also the restriction, so far, that these coherent states are only defined at the Kinematic level, and now one has to lift them to the level of $\mathcal{H}_{Diff}$ and $\mathcal{H}_{Phys}$. It can be shown that Thiemann's Hamiltonian constraint is required to be graph-changing in order to resolve problem 3 in some sense. The master constraint algebra however is trivial and so the requirement that it be graph-changing can be lifted and indeed non-graph-changing master constraint operators have been defined. As far as is currently known, this problem is still out of reach.
5. Formulating observables for classical general relativity is a formidable problem because of its non-linear nature and spacetime diffeomorphism invariance. A systematic approximation scheme to calculate observables has been recently developed.

Difficulties in trying to examine the semiclassical limit of the theory should not be confused with it having the wrong semiclassical limit.

Concerning issue number 2 above, consider so-called weave states. Ordinary measurements of geometric quantities are macroscopic, and Planckian discreteness is smoothed out. The fabric of a T-shirt is analogous: at a distance it is a smooth curved two-dimensional surface, but on closer inspection we see that it is actually composed of thousands of one-dimensional linked threads. The image of space given in LQG is similar. Consider a large spin network formed by a large number of nodes and links, each of Planck scale. Probed at a macroscopic scale, it appears as a three-dimensional continuous metric geometry.

To make contact with low energy physics it is mandatory to develop approximation schemes both for the physical inner product and for Dirac observables; the spin foam models that have been intensively studied can be viewed as avenues toward approximation schemes for said physical inner product.

Markopoulou, et al. adopted the idea of noiseless subsystems in an attempt to solve the problem of the low energy limit in background independent quantum gravity theories. The idea has led to the possibility of matter of the Standard Model being identified with emergent degrees of freedom from some versions of LQG (see section below: LQG and related research programs).

As Wightman emphasized in the 1950s, in Minkowski QFTs the $n-$ point functions
$$W (x_1, \dots , x_n) = \langle 0 | \phi (x_n) \dots \phi (x_1) |0 \rangle ,$$
completely determine the theory. In particular, one can calculate the scattering amplitudes from these quantities. As explained below in the section on the Background independent scattering amplitudes, in the background-independent context, the $n-$ point functions refer to a state and in gravity that state can naturally encode information about a specific geometry which can then appear in the expressions of these quantities. To leading order, LQG calculations have been shown to agree in an appropriate sense with the $n-$point functions calculated in the effective low energy quantum general relativity.

== Improved dynamics and the master constraint ==
=== The master constraint ===
Thiemann's Master Constraint Programme for Loop Quantum Gravity (LQG) was proposed as a classically equivalent way to impose the infinite number of Hamiltonian constraint equations in terms of a single master constraint $M$, which involves the square of the constraints in question. An initial objection to the use of the master constraint was that on first sight it did not seem to encode information about the observables; because the Master constraint is quadratic in the constraint, when one computes its Poisson bracket with any quantity, the result is proportional to the constraint, therefore it vanishes when the constraints are imposed and as such does not select out particular phase space functions. However, it was realized that the condition
$$\{ O , \{ O , M \} \}_{M = 0} = 0,$$
is where $O$ is at least a twice differentiable function on phase space is equivalent to $O$ being a weak Dirac observable with respect to the constraints in question. So the master constraint does capture information about the observables. Because of its significance this is known as the master equation.

That the master constraint Poisson algebra is an honest Lie algebra opens the possibility of using a method, known as group averaging, in order to construct solutions of the infinite number of Hamiltonian constraints, a physical inner product thereon and Dirac observables via what is known as refined algebraic quantization, or RAQ.

=== The quantum master constraint ===
Define the quantum master constraint (regularisation issues aside) as
$$\hat{M} := \int d^3x \widehat{\left( \frac{H}{\sqrt[4]{\det (q(x))}} \right)}^\dagger(x) \widehat{\left(\frac{H}{\sqrt[4]{\det (q(x))}} \right)} (x).$$

Obviously,
$$\widehat{\left( \frac{H}{\sqrt[4]{\det (q(x))}} \right)} (x) \Psi = 0$$
for all $x$ implies $\hat{M} \Psi = 0$. Conversely, if $\hat{M} \Psi = 0$ then
$$0 = \left \langle \Psi , \hat{M} \Psi \right \rangle = \int d^3x \left\| \widehat{\left( \frac{H}{\sqrt[4]{\det (q(x))}} \right)} (x) \Psi \right\|^2 \qquad Eq \; 4$$
implies
$$\widehat{\left( \frac{H}{\sqrt[4]{\det (q(x))}} \right)} (x) \Psi = 0.$$

First compute the matrix elements of the would-be operator $\hat{M}$, that is, the quadratic form $Q_M$. $Q_M$ is a graph changing, diffeomorphism invariant quadratic form that cannot exist on the kinematic Hilbert space $H_{Kin}$, and must be defined on $H_{Diff}$. Since the master constraint operator $\hat{M}$ is densely defined on $H_{Diff}$, then $\hat{M}$ is a positive and symmetric operator in $H_{Diff}$. Therefore, the quadratic form $Q_M$ associated with $\hat{M}$ is closable. The closure of $Q_M$ is the quadratic form of a unique self-adjoint operator $\hat{\overline{M}}$, called the Friedrichs extension of $\hat{M}$. We relabel $\hat{\overline{M}}$ as $\hat{M}$ for simplicity.

Note that the presence of an inner product, viz Eq 4, means there are no superfluous solutions i.e. there are no $\Psi$ such that
$$\widehat{\left( \frac{H}{\sqrt[4]{\det (q(x))}} \right)} (x) \Psi \not= 0,$$
but for which $\hat{M} \Psi = 0$.

It is also possible to construct a quadratic form $Q_{M_E}$ for what is called the extended master constraint (discussed below) on $H_{Kin}$ which also involves the weighted integral of the square of the spatial diffeomorphism constraint (this is possible because $Q_{M_E}$ is not graph changing).

The spectrum of the master constraint may not contain zero due to normal or factor ordering effects which are finite but similar in nature to the infinite vacuum energies of background-dependent quantum field theories. In this case it turns out to be physically correct to replace $\hat{M}$ with $\hat{M}' := \hat{M} - \min (spec (\hat{M})) \hat{1}$ provided that the "normal ordering constant" vanishes in the classical limit, that is,
$$\lim_{\hbar \to 0} \min (spec(\hat{M})) = 0,$$
so that $\hat{M}'$ is a valid quantisation of $M$.

=== Testing the master constraint ===
The constraints in their primitive form are rather singular, this was the reason for integrating them over test functions to obtain smeared constraints. However, it would appear that the equation for the master constraint, given above, is even more singular involving the product of two primitive constraints (although integrated over space). Squaring the constraint is dangerous as it could lead to worsened ultraviolet behaviour of the corresponding operator and hence the master constraint programme must be approached with care.

In doing so the master constraint programme has been satisfactorily tested in a number of model systems with non-trivial constraint algebras, free and interacting field theories. The master constraint for LQG was established as a genuine positive self-adjoint operator and the physical Hilbert space of LQG was shown to be non-empty, a consistency test LQG must pass to be a viable theory of quantum general relativity.

=== Applications of the master constraint ===
The master constraint has been employed in attempts to approximate the physical inner product and define more rigorous path integrals.

The Consistent Discretizations approach to LQG, is an application of the master constraint program to construct the physical Hilbert space of the canonical theory.

=== Spin foam from the master constraint ===
The master constraint is easily generalized to incorporate the other constraints. It is then referred to as the extended master constraint, denoted $M_E$. We can define the extended master constraint which imposes both the Hamiltonian constraint and spatial diffeomorphism constraint as a single operator,
$$M_E = \int_\Sigma d^3x {H (x)^2 - q^{ab} V_a (x) V_b (x) \over \sqrt{\det (q)}} .$$

Setting this single constraint to zero is equivalent to $H(x) = 0$ and $V_a (x) = 0$ for all $x$ in $\Sigma$. This constraint implements the spatial diffeomorphism and Hamiltonian constraint at the same time on the Kinematic Hilbert space. The physical inner product is then defined as
$$\langle\phi, \psi\rangle_{\text{Phys}} = \lim_{T \to \infty} \left\langle\phi, \int_{-T}^T dt e^{i t \hat{M}_E} \psi\right\rangle$$
(as $\delta (\hat{M_E}) = \lim_{T \to \infty} \int_{-T}^T dt e^{i t \hat{M}_E}$). A spin foam representation of this expression is obtained by splitting the $t$-parameter in discrete steps and writing
$$e^{i t \hat{M}_E} = \lim_{n \to \infty} \left [e^{i t \hat{M}_E / n} \right]^n = \lim_{n \to \infty} [1 + i t \hat{M}_E / n]^n.$$

The spin foam description then follows from the application of $[1 + i t \hat{M}_E / n]$ on a spin network resulting in a linear combination of new spin networks whose graph and labels have been modified. Obviously an approximation is made by truncating the value of $n$ to some finite integer. An advantage of the extended master constraint is that we are working at the kinematic level and so far it is only here we have access semiclassical coherent states. Moreover, one can find none graph changing versions of this master constraint operator, which are the only type of operators appropriate for these coherent states.

=== Algebraic quantum gravity (AQG) ===
The master constraint programme has evolved into a fully combinatorial treatment of gravity known as algebraic quantum gravity (AQG). The non-graph changing master constraint operator is adapted in the framework of algebraic quantum gravity. While AQG is inspired by LQG, it differs drastically from it because in AQG there is fundamentally no topology or differential structure – it is background independent in a more generalized sense and could possibly have something to say about topology change. In this new formulation of quantum gravity AQG semiclassical states always control the fluctuations of all present degrees of freedom. This makes the AQG semiclassical analysis superior over that of LQG, and progress has been made in establishing it has the correct semiclassical limit and providing contact with familiar low energy physics.

== Physical applications of LQG ==
=== Black hole entropy ===
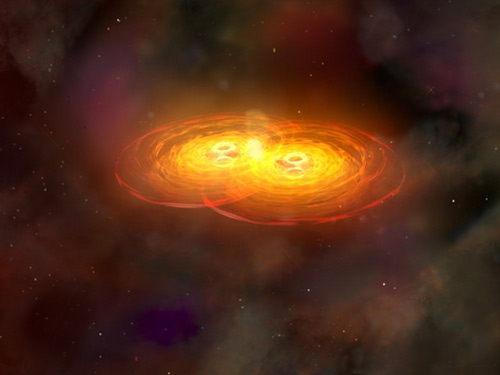
An artist depiction of two black holes merging, a process in which the laws of thermodynamics are upheld

Black hole thermodynamics is the area of study that seeks to reconcile the laws of thermodynamics with the existence of black hole event horizons. The no hair conjecture of general relativity states that a black hole is characterized only by its mass, its charge, and its angular momentum; hence, it has no entropy. It appears, then, that one can violate the second law of thermodynamics by dropping an object with nonzero entropy into a black hole. Work by Stephen Hawking and Jacob Bekenstein showed that the second law of thermodynamics can be preserved by assigning to each black hole a black-hole entropy
$$S_{\text{BH}} = \frac{k_{\text{B}}A}{4\ell_{\text{P}}^2},$$
where $A$ is the area of the hole's event horizon, $k_{\text{B}}$ is the Boltzmann constant, and $\ell_{\text{P}} = \sqrt{G\hbar/c^{3}}$ is the Planck length. The fact that the black hole entropy is also the maximal entropy that can be obtained by the Bekenstein bound (wherein the Bekenstein bound becomes an equality) was the main observation that led to the holographic principle.

An oversight in the application of the no-hair theorem is the assumption that the relevant degrees of freedom accounting for the entropy of the black hole must be classical in nature; what if they were purely quantum mechanical instead and had non-zero entropy? This is what is realized in the LQG derivation of black hole entropy, and can be seen as a consequence of its background-independence – the classical black hole spacetime comes about from the semiclassical limit of the quantum state of the gravitational field, but there are many quantum states that have the same semiclassical limit. Specifically, in LQG it is possible to associate a quantum geometrical interpretation to the microstates: These are the quantum geometries of the horizon which are consistent with the area, $A$, of the black hole and the topology of the horizon (i.e. spherical). LQG offers a geometric explanation of the finiteness of the entropy and of the proportionality of the area of the horizon. These calculations have been generalized to rotating black holes.

Representation of quantum geometries of the horizon. Polymer excitations in the bulk puncture the horizon, endowing it with quantized area. Intrinsically the horizon is flat except at punctures where it acquires a quantized deficit angle or quantized amount of curvature. These deficit angles add up to $4 \pi$.

It is possible to derive, from the covariant formulation of full quantum theory (Spinfoam) the correct relation between energy and area (1st law), the Unruh temperature and the distribution that yields Hawking entropy. The calculation makes use of the notion of dynamical horizon and is done for non-extremal black holes.

A recent success of the theory in this direction is the computation of the entropy of all non singular black holes directly from theory and independent of Immirzi parameter. The result is the expected formula $S=A/4$, where $S$ is the entropy and $A$ the area of the black hole, derived by Bekenstein and Hawking on heuristic grounds. This is the only known derivation of this formula from a fundamental theory, for the case of generic non singular black holes. Older attempts at this calculation had difficulties. The problem was that although Loop quantum gravity predicted that the entropy of a black hole is proportional to the area of the event horizon, the result depended on a crucial free parameter in the theory, the above-mentioned Immirzi parameter. However, there is no known computation of the Immirzi parameter, so it was fixed by demanding agreement with Bekenstein and Hawking's calculation of the black hole entropy.

=== Hawking radiation in loop quantum gravity ===
A detailed study of the quantum geometry of a black hole horizon has been made using loop quantum gravity. Loop-quantization does not reproduce the result for black hole entropy originally discovered by Bekenstein and Hawking, unless one chooses the value of the Immirzi parameter to cancel out another constant that arises in the derivation. However, it led to the computation of higher-order corrections to the entropy and radiation of black holes.

Based on the fluctuations of the horizon area, a quantum black hole exhibits deviations from the Hawking spectrum that would be observable were X-rays from Hawking radiation of evaporating primordial black holes to be observed. The quantum effects are centered at a set of discrete and unblended frequencies highly pronounced on top of Hawking radiation spectrum.

=== Planck star ===
In 2014 Carlo Rovelli and Francesca Vidotto proposed that there is a Planck star inside every black hole. Based on LQG, the theory states that as stars are collapsing into black holes, the energy density reaches the Planck energy density, causing a repulsive force that creates a star. Furthermore, the existence of such a star would resolve the black hole firewall and black hole information paradox.

=== Loop quantum cosmology ===
The popular and technical literature makes extensive references to the LQG-related topic of loop quantum cosmology. LQC was mainly developed by Martin Bojowald. It was popularized in Scientific American for predicting a Big Bounce prior to the Big Bang. Loop quantum cosmology (LQC) is a symmetry-reduced model of classical general relativity quantized using methods that mimic those of loop quantum gravity (LQG) that predicts a "quantum bridge" between contracting and expanding cosmological branches.

Achievements of LQC have been the resolution of the big bang singularity, the prediction of a Big Bounce, and a natural mechanism for inflation.

LQC models share features of LQG and so is a useful toy model. However, the results obtained are subject to the usual restriction that a truncated classical theory, then quantized, might not display the true behaviour of the full theory due to artificial suppression of degrees of freedom that might have large quantum fluctuations in the full theory. It has been argued that singularity avoidance in LQC are by mechanisms only available in these restrictive models and that singularity avoidance in the full theory can still be obtained but by a more subtle feature of LQG.

=== Loop quantum gravity phenomenology ===
Quantum gravity effects are difficult to measure because the Planck length is so small. However recently physicists, such as Jack Palmer, have started to consider the possibility of measuring quantum gravity effects mostly from astrophysical observations and gravitational wave detectors. The energy of those fluctuations at scales this small cause space-perturbations which are visible at higher scales.

=== Background-independent scattering amplitudes ===
Loop quantum gravity is formulated in a background-independent language. No spacetime is assumed a priori, but rather it is built up by the states of theory themselves – however scattering amplitudes are derived from $n$-point functions (Correlation function) and these, formulated in conventional quantum field theory, are functions of points of a background spacetime. The relation between the background-independent formalism and the conventional formalism of quantum field theory on a given spacetime is not obvious, and it is not obvious how to recover low-energy quantities from the full background-independent theory. One would like to derive the $n$-point functions of the theory from the background-independent formalism, in order to compare them with the standard perturbative expansion of quantum general relativity and therefore check that loop quantum gravity yields the correct low-energy limit.

A strategy for addressing this problem has been suggested; by studying the boundary amplitude, namely a path integral over a finite spacetime region, seen as a function of the boundary value of the field. In conventional quantum field theory, this boundary amplitude is well–defined and codes the physical information of the theory; it does so in quantum gravity as well, but in a fully background–independent manner. A generally covariant definition of $n$-point functions can then be based on the idea that the distance between physical points – arguments of the $n$-point function is determined by the state of the gravitational field on the boundary of the spacetime region considered.

Progress has been made in calculating background-independent scattering amplitudes this way with the use of spin foams. This is a way to extract physical information from the theory. Claims to have reproduced the correct behaviour for graviton scattering amplitudes and to have recovered classical gravity have been made. "We have calculated Newton's law starting from a world with no space and no time." – Carlo Rovelli.

== Gravitons, string theory, supersymmetry, extra dimensions in LQG ==
Some quantum theories of gravity posit a spin-2 quantum field that is quantized, giving rise to gravitons. In string theory, one generally starts with quantized excitations on top of a classically fixed background. This theory is thus described as background dependent. Particles like photons as well as changes in the spacetime geometry (gravitons) are both described as excitations on the string worldsheet. The background dependence of string theory can have physical consequences, such as determining the number of quark generations. In contrast, loop quantum gravity, like general relativity, is manifestly background independent, eliminating the background required in string theory. Loop quantum gravity, like string theory, also aims to overcome the nonrenormalizable divergences of quantum field theories.

LQG does not introduce a background and excitations living on such a background, so LQG does not use gravitons as building blocks. Instead one expects that one may recover a kind of semiclassical limit or weak field limit where something like "gravitons" will show up again. In contrast, gravitons play a key role in string theory where they are among the first (massless) level of excitations of a superstring.

LQG differs from string theory in that it is formulated in 3 and 4 dimensions and without supersymmetry or Kaluza–Klein extra dimensions, while the latter requires both to be true. There is no experimental evidence to date that confirms string theory's predictions of supersymmetry and Kaluza–Klein extra dimensions. In a 2003 paper "A Dialog on Quantum Gravity", Carlo Rovelli regards the fact LQG is formulated in 4 dimensions and without supersymmetry as a strength of the theory as it represents the most parsimonious explanation, consistent with current experimental results, over its rival string/M-theory. Proponents of string theory will often point to the fact that, among other things, it demonstrably reproduces the established theories of general relativity and quantum field theory in the appropriate limits, which loop quantum gravity has struggled to do. In that sense string theory's connection to established physics may be considered more reliable and less speculative, at the mathematical level. Loop quantum gravity has nothing to say about the matter (fermions) in the universe.

Since LQG has been formulated in 4 dimensions (with and without supersymmetry), and M-theory requires supersymmetry and 11 dimensions, a direct comparison between the two has not been possible. It is possible to extend mainstream LQG formalism to higher-dimensional supergravity, general relativity with supersymmetry and Kaluza–Klein extra dimensions should experimental evidence establish their existence. It would therefore be desirable to have higher-dimensional Supergravity loop quantizations at one's disposal in order to compare these approaches. A series of papers have been published attempting this. Most recently, Thiemann (and alumni) have made progress toward calculating black hole entropy for supergravity in higher dimensions. It will be useful to compare these results to the corresponding super string calculations.

== LQG and related research programs ==
Several research groups have attempted to combine LQG with other research programs: Johannes Aastrup, Jesper M. Grimstrup et al. research combines noncommutative geometry with canonical quantum gravity and Ashtekar variables, Laurent Freidel, Simone Speziale, et al., spinors and twistor theory with loop quantum gravity, and Lee Smolin et al. with Verlinde entropic gravity and loop gravity. Stephon Alexander, Antonino Marciano and Lee Smolin have attempted to explain the origins of weak force chirality in terms of Ashketar's variables, which describe gravity as chiral, and LQG with Yang–Mills theory fields in four dimensions. Sundance Bilson-Thompson, Hackett et al., has attempted to introduce the standard model via LQGs degrees of freedom as an emergent property (by employing the idea of noiseless subsystems, a notion introduced in a more general situation for constrained systems by Fotini Markopoulou-Kalamara et al.)

Furthermore, LQG has drawn philosophical comparisons with causal dynamical triangulation and asymptotically safe gravity, and the spinfoam with group field theory and AdS/CFT correspondence. Smolin and Wen have suggested combining LQG with string-net liquid, tensors, and Smolin and Fotini Markopoulou-Kalamara quantum graphity. There is the consistent discretizations approach. Also, Pullin and Gambini provide a framework to connect the path integral and canonical approaches to quantum gravity. They may help reconcile the spin foam and canonical loop representation approaches. Recent research by Chris Duston and Matilde Marcolli introduces topology change via topspin networks.

== Problems and comparisons with alternative approaches ==
Some of the major unsolved problems in physics are theoretical, meaning that existing theories seem incapable of explaining a certain observed phenomenon or experimental result. The others are experimental, meaning that there is a difficulty in creating an experiment to test a proposed theory or investigate a phenomenon in greater detail.

Many of these problems apply to LQG, including:

- Can quantum mechanics and general relativity be realized as a fully consistent theory (perhaps as a quantum field theory)?
- Is spacetime fundamentally continuous or discrete?
- Would a consistent theory involve a force mediated by a hypothetical graviton, or be a product of a discrete structure of spacetime itself (as in loop quantum gravity)?
- Are there deviations from the predictions of general relativity at very small or very large scales or in other extreme circumstances that flow from a quantum gravity theory?

The theory of LQG is one possible solution to the problem of quantum gravity, as is string theory. There are substantial differences however. For example, string theory also addresses unification, the understanding of all known forces and particles as manifestations of a single entity, by postulating extra dimensions and so-far unobserved additional particles and symmetries. Contrary to this, LQG is based only on quantum theory and general relativity and its scope is limited to understanding the quantum aspects of the gravitational interaction. On the other hand, the consequences of LQG are radical, because they fundamentally change the nature of space and time and provide a tentative but detailed physical and mathematical picture of quantum spacetime.

Presently, no semiclassical limit recovering general relativity has been shown to exist. This means it remains unproven that LQG's description of spacetime at the Planck scale has the right continuum limit (described by general relativity with possible quantum corrections). Specifically, the dynamics of the theory are encoded in the Hamiltonian constraint, but there is no candidate Hamiltonian. Other technical problems include finding off-shell closure of the constraint algebra and physical inner product vector space, coupling to matter fields of quantum field theory, fate of the renormalization of the graviton in perturbation theory that lead to ultraviolet divergence beyond 2-loops (see one-loop Feynman diagram in Feynman diagram).

While there has been a proposal relating to observation of naked singularities, and doubly special relativity as a part of a program called loop quantum cosmology, there is no experimental observation for which loop quantum gravity makes a prediction not made by the Standard Model or general relativity (a problem that plagues all current theories of quantum gravity). Because of the above-mentioned lack of a semiclassical limit, LQG has not yet even reproduced the predictions made by general relativity.

An alternative criticism is that general relativity may be an effective field theory, and therefore quantization ignores the fundamental degrees of freedom.

== See also ==
- Problem of time – Conceptual conflict between general relativity and quantum mechanics
- Ashtekar variables – Variables used in general relativity
- C*-algebra – Topological complex vector space
- Category theory – General theory of mathematical structures
- Doubly special relativity – Generalization of special relativity
- Gelfand–Naimark–Segal construction – Correspondence in functional analysis
- Group field theory – Quantum field theory with a Lie group base manifold
- Heyting algebra – Algebraic structure used in logic
- Hamiltonian constraint – Key constraint in some theories admitting Hamiltonian formulations
- Hamiltonian constraint of LQG – Constraint in loop quantum gravity
- Immirzi parameter – Numerical coefficient in loop quantum gravity
- Knot invariant – Function of a knot that takes the same value for equivalent knots
- Kodama state – Zero energy solution to the Schrödinger equation in loop quantum gravity
- Lorentz invariance in loop quantum gravity – Aspect of loop quantum gravity
- Noncommutative geometry – Branch of mathematics
- Regge calculus – Formalism in general relativity
- S-knot – Equivalence class of spin networks
- Spin foam – Topological structure in loop quantum gravity
- String-net liquid – Condensed matter physics model involving only closed loops
- String theory – Theory of subatomic structure
- Supersymmetry – Symmetry between bosons and fermions
- Topos theory – Type of category in mathematics
- Einstein–Cartan theory – Classical theory of gravitation

== Works cited ==
- Aastrup, Johannes (2012). "Intersecting Quantum Gravity with Noncommutative Geometry – a Review". Symmetry, Integrability and Geometry: Methods and Applications. 8: 18. arXiv:1203.6164. Bibcode:2012SIGMA...8..018A. doi:10.3842/SIGMA.2012.018. S2CID 18279314.
- Alesci, E.; Thiemann, T.; Zipfel, A. (2011). "Linking covariant and canonical LQG: new solutions to the Euclidean Scalar Constraint". Physical Review D. 86 (2) 024017. arXiv:1109.1290. Bibcode:2012PhRvD..86b4017A. doi:10.1103/PhysRevD.86.024017. S2CID 119210827.
- Alexander, Stephon; Marcianò, Antonino; Smolin, Lee (2014). "Gravitational origin of the weak interaction's chirality". Physical Review D. 89 (6) 065017. arXiv:1212.5246. Bibcode:2014PhRvD..89f5017A. doi:10.1103/PhysRevD.89.065017. S2CID 118727458.
- Alexander, Stephon; Marcianò, Antonino; Tacchi, Ruggero Altair (2012). "Towards a Loop Quantum Gravity and Yang–Mills unification". Physics Letters B. 716 (2): 330. arXiv:1105.3480. Bibcode:2012PhLB..716..330A. doi:10.1016/j.physletb.2012.07.034. S2CID 118655185.
- Ansari, M. H. (2007). "Spectroscopy of a canonically quantized horizon". Nuclear Physics B. 783 (3): 179–212. arXiv:hep-th/0607081. Bibcode:2007NuPhB.783..179A. doi:10.1016/j.nuclphysb.2007.01.009. S2CID 9966483.
- Ansari, M. H. (2008). "Generic degeneracy and entropy in loop quantum gravity". Nuclear Physics B. 795 (3): 635–644. arXiv:gr-qc/0603121. Bibcode:2008NuPhB.795..635A. doi:10.1016/j.nuclphysb.2007.11.038. S2CID 119039723.
- Ashtekar, A.; Bombelli, L.; Corichi, A. (2005). "Semiclassical States for Constrained Systems". Physical Review D. 72 (1): 025008. arXiv:hep-ph/0504114. Bibcode:2005PhRvD..72a5008C. doi:10.1103/PhysRevD.72.015008. S2CID 16541870.
- Ashtekar, Abhay; Baez, John; Corichi, Alejandro; Krasnov, Kirill (1998). "Quantum Geometry and Black Hole Entropy". Physical Review Letters. 80 (5): 904–907. arXiv:gr-qc/9710007. Bibcode:1998PhRvL..80..904A. doi:10.1103/PhysRevLett.80.904. S2CID 18980849.
- Ashtekar, Abhay; Engle, Jonathan; Broeck, Chris Van Den (2005). "Quantum horizons and black-hole entropy: Inclusion of distortion and rotation". Classical and Quantum Gravity. 22 (4): L27. arXiv:gr-qc/0412003. Bibcode:2005CQGra..22L..27A. doi:10.1088/0264-9381/22/4/L02. S2CID 53842643.
- Baez, J.; de Muniain, J. P. (1994). Gauge Fields, Knots and Quantum Gravity. Series on Knots and Everything. Vol. 4. World Scientific. Part III, chapter 4. ISBN 978-981-02-1729-7.
- Bahr, Benjamin; Thiemann, Thomas (2007). "Approximating the physical inner product of loop quantum cosmology". Classical and Quantum Gravity. 24 (8): 2109–2138. arXiv:gr-qc/0607075. Bibcode:2007CQGra..24.2109B. doi:10.1088/0264-9381/24/8/011. S2CID 13953362.
- Barrett, J.; Crane, L. (2000). "A Lorentzian signature model for quantum general relativity". Classical and Quantum Gravity. 17 (16): 3101–3118. arXiv:gr-qc/9904025. Bibcode:2000CQGra..17.3101B. doi:10.1088/0264-9381/17/16/302. S2CID 14192824.
- Bianchi, Eugenio (18–20 January 2010). "Loop Quantum Gravity" (PDF). Institut de Physique de Nice. Archived from the original (PDF) on 18 October 2016.
- Bianchi, Eugenio (2012). "Entropy of Non-Extremal Black Holes from Loop Gravity". arXiv:1204.5122 [gr-qc].
- Bilson-Thompson, Sundance (2012). "Emergent Braided Matter of Quantum Geometry". Symmetry, Integrability and Geometry: Methods and Applications. 8: 014. arXiv:1109.0080. Bibcode:2012SIGMA...8..014B. doi:10.3842/SIGMA.2012.014. S2CID 14955019.
- Bilson-Thompson, Sundance O.; Markopoulou, Fotini; Smolin, Lee (2007). "Quantum gravity and the standard model". Classical and Quantum Gravity. 24 (16): 3975–3994. arXiv:hep-th/0603022. Bibcode:2007CQGra..24.3975B. doi:10.1088/0264-9381/24/16/002. S2CID 37406474.
- Bodendorfer, N. (2013). "Black hole entropy from loop quantum gravity in higher dimensions". Physics Letters B. 726 (4–5): 887–891. arXiv:1307.5029. Bibcode:2013PhLB..726..887B. doi:10.1016/j.physletb.2013.09.043. S2CID 119331759.
- Bodendorfer, N.; Thiemann, T.; Thurn, A. (2012). "Towards Loop Quantum Supergravity (LQSG)". Physics Letters B. 711 (2): 205. arXiv:1106.1103. Bibcode:2012PhLB..711..205B. doi:10.1016/j.physletb.2012.04.003. S2CID 67817878.
- Bodendorfer, N.; Thiemann, T.; Thurn, A. (2013a). "New variables for classical and quantum gravity in all dimensions: I. Hamiltonian analysis". Classical and Quantum Gravity. 30 (4) 045001. arXiv:1105.3703. Bibcode:2013CQGra..30d5001B. doi:10.1088/0264-9381/30/4/045001. S2CID 55215120.
- Bodendorfer, N.; Thiemann, T.; Thurn, A. (2013b). "New variables for classical and quantum gravity in all dimensions: II. Lagrangian analysis". Classical and Quantum Gravity. 30 (4) 045002. arXiv:1105.3704. Bibcode:2013CQGra..30d5002B. doi:10.1088/0264-9381/30/4/045002. S2CID 55736166.
- Bodendorfer, N.; Thiemann, T.; Thurn, A. (2013c). "New variables for classical and quantum gravity in all dimensions: III. Quantum theory". Classical and Quantum Gravity. 30 (4) 045003. arXiv:1105.3705. Bibcode:2013CQGra..30d5003B. doi:10.1088/0264-9381/30/4/045003. S2CID 55516259.
- Bodendorfer, N.; Thiemann, T.; Thurn, A. (2013d). "New variables for classical and quantum gravity in all dimensions: IV. Matter coupling". Classical and Quantum Gravity. 30 (4) 045004. arXiv:1105.3706. Bibcode:2013CQGra..30d5004B. doi:10.1088/0264-9381/30/4/045004. S2CID 55530282.
- Bodendorfer, N.; Thiemann, T.; Thurn, A. (2013e). "On the implementation of the canonical quantum simplicity constraint". Classical and Quantum Gravity. 30 (4) 045005. arXiv:1105.3707. Bibcode:2013CQGra..30d5005B. doi:10.1088/0264-9381/30/4/045005. S2CID 56074665.
- Bodendorfer, N.; Thiemann, T.; Thurn, A. (2013f). "Towards loop quantum supergravity (LQSG): I. Rarita–Schwinger sector". Classical and Quantum Gravity. 30 (4) 045006. arXiv:1105.3709. Bibcode:2013CQGra..30d5006B. doi:10.1088/0264-9381/30/4/045006. S2CID 55726240.
- Bodendorfer, N.; Thiemann, T.; Thurn, A. (2013g). "Towards loop quantum supergravity (LQSG): II.p-form sector". Classical and Quantum Gravity. 30 (4) 045007. arXiv:1105.3710. Bibcode:2013CQGra..30d5007B. doi:10.1088/0264-9381/30/4/045007. S2CID 56562416.
- Bodendorfer, N.; Thiemann, T.; Thurn, A. (2014). "New variables for classical and quantum gravity in all dimensions: V. Isolated horizon boundary degrees of freedom". Classical and Quantum Gravity. 31 (5) 055002. arXiv:1304.2679. Bibcode:2014CQGra..31e5002B. doi:10.1088/0264-9381/31/5/055002. S2CID 119265359.
- Bohm, D. (1989). Quantum Theory. Dover Publications. ISBN 978-0-486-65969-5.
- Bohr, N. (1920). "Über die Serienspektra der Element". Zeitschrift für Physik. 2 (5): 423–478. Bibcode:1920ZPhy....2..423B. doi:10.1007/BF01329978. S2CID 121792424.
- Bojowald, Martin (October 2008). "Big Bang or Big Bounce?: New Theory on the Universe's Birth". Scientific American.(available here as of 2 May 2017)
- Bojowald, Martin; Perez, Alejandro (2009). "Spin foam quantization and anomalies". General Relativity and Gravitation. 42 (4): 877. arXiv:gr-qc/0303026. Bibcode:2010GReGr..42..877B. doi:10.1007/s10714-009-0892-9. S2CID 118474.
- Bousso, Raphael (2002). "The Holographic Principle". Reviews of Modern Physics. 74 (3): 825–874. arXiv:hep-th/0203101. Bibcode:2002RvMP...74..825B. doi:10.1103/RevModPhys.74.825. S2CID 55096624.
- Brunnemann, J.; Thiemann, T. (2006a). "On (cosmological) singularity avoidance in loop quantum gravity". Classical and Quantum Gravity. 23 (5): 1395–1428. arXiv:gr-qc/0505032. Bibcode:2006CQGra..23.1395B. doi:10.1088/0264-9381/23/5/001. S2CID 17901385.
- Brunnemann, J.; Thiemann, T. (2006b). "Unboundedness of triad-like operators in loop quantum gravity". Classical and Quantum Gravity. 23 (5): 1429–1484. arXiv:gr-qc/0505033. Bibcode:2006CQGra..23.1429B. doi:10.1088/0264-9381/23/5/002. S2CID 15885452.
- Conrady, Florian; Doplicher, Luisa; Oeckl, Robert; Rovelli, Carlo; Testa, Massimo (2004). "Minkowski vacuum in background independent quantum gravity". Physical Review D. 69 (6) 064019. arXiv:gr-qc/0307118. Bibcode:2004PhRvD..69f4019C. doi:10.1103/PhysRevD.69.064019. S2CID 30190407.
- Conrady, Florian; Rovelli, Carlo (2004). "Generalized Schrödinger Equation in Euclidean Field Theory". International Journal of Modern Physics A. 19 (24): 4037. arXiv:hep-th/0310246. Bibcode:2004IJMPA..19.4037C. doi:10.1142/S0217751X04019445. S2CID 18048123.
- Dittrich, B. (2006). "Partial and Complete Observables for Canonical General Relativity". Classical and Quantum Gravity. 23 (22): 6155–6184. arXiv:gr-qc/0507106. Bibcode:2006CQGra..23.6155D. doi:10.1088/0264-9381/23/22/006. S2CID 6945571.
- Dittrich, B. (2007). "Partial and Complete Observables for Hamiltonian Constrained Systems". General Relativity and Gravitation. 39 (11): 1891–1927. arXiv:gr-qc/0411013. Bibcode:2007GReGr..39.1891D. doi:10.1007/s10714-007-0495-2. S2CID 14617707.
- Dittrich, B.; Thiemann, T. (2006a). "Testing the master constraint programme for loop quantum gravity: I. General framework". Classical and Quantum Gravity. 23 (4): 1025–1066. arXiv:gr-qc/0411138. Bibcode:2006CQGra..23.1025D. doi:10.1088/0264-9381/23/4/001. S2CID 16155563.
- Dittrich, B.; Thiemann, T. (2006b). "Testing the master constraint programme for loop quantum gravity: II. Finite-dimensional systems". Classical and Quantum Gravity. 23 (4): 1067–1088. arXiv:gr-qc/0411139. Bibcode:2006CQGra..23.1067D. doi:10.1088/0264-9381/23/4/002. S2CID 14395043.
- Dittrich, B.; Thiemann, T. (2006c). "Testing the master constraint programme for loop quantum gravity: III. Models". Classical and Quantum Gravity. 23 (4): 1089–1120. arXiv:gr-qc/0411140. Bibcode:2006CQGra..23.1089D. doi:10.1088/0264-9381/23/4/003. S2CID 16944390.
- Dittrich, B.; Thiemann, T. (2006d). "Testing the master constraint programme for loop quantum gravity: IV. Free field theories". Classical and Quantum Gravity. 23 (4): 1121–1142. arXiv:gr-qc/0411141. Bibcode:2006CQGra..23.1121D. doi:10.1088/0264-9381/23/4/004. S2CID 16510175.
- Dittrich, B.; Thiemann, T. (2006e). "Testing the master constraint programme for loop quantum gravity: V. Interacting field theories". Classical and Quantum Gravity. 23 (4): 1143–1162. arXiv:gr-qc/0411142. Bibcode:2006CQGra..23.1143D. doi:10.1088/0264-9381/23/4/005. S2CID 17888279.
- Doplicher, Luisa (2004). "Generalized Tomonaga-Schwinger equation from the Hadamard formula". Physical Review D. 70 (6) 064037. arXiv:gr-qc/0405006. Bibcode:2004PhRvD..70f4037D. doi:10.1103/PhysRevD.70.064037. S2CID 14402915.
- Dreyer, O.; Markopoulou, F.; Smolin, L. (2006). "Symmetry and entropy of black hole horizons". Nuclear Physics B. 774 (1–2): 1–13. arXiv:hep-th/0409056. Bibcode:2006NuPhB.744....1D. doi:10.1016/j.nuclphysb.2006.02.045. S2CID 14282122.
- Duston, Christopher L. (13 August 2013). "The Fundamental Group of a Spatial Section Represented by a Topspin Network". arXiv:1308.2934. Bibcode:2013arXiv1308.2934D.
- Engle, J.; Pereira, R.; Rovelli, C. (2009). "Loop-Quantum-Gravity Vertex Amplitude". Physical Review Letters. 99 (16) 161301. arXiv:0705.2388. Bibcode:2007PhRvL..99p1301E. doi:10.1103/physrevlett.99.161301. PMID 17995233. S2CID 27052383.
- Fairbairn, W. J.; Meusburger, C. (2011). "q-Deformation of Lorentzian spin foam models". arXiv:1112.2511 [gr-qc].
- Fernando, J.; Barbero, G. (1995a). "Reality Conditions and Ashtekar Variables: A Different Perspective". Physical Review D. 51 (10): 5498–5506. arXiv:gr-qc/9410013. Bibcode:1995PhRvD..51.5498B. doi:10.1103/PhysRevD.51.5498. PMID 10018308. S2CID 16131908.
- Fernando, J.; Barbero, G. (1995b). "Real Ashtekar Variables for Lorentzian Signature Space-times". Physical Review D. 51 (10): 5507–5520. arXiv:gr-qc/9410014. Bibcode:1995PhRvD..51.5507B. doi:10.1103/PhysRevD.51.5507. PMID 10018309. S2CID 16314220.
- Fleischhack, C. (2006). "Irreducibility of the Weyl algebra in loop quantum gravity". Physical Review Letters. 97 (6) 061302. Bibcode:2006PhRvL..97f1302F. doi:10.1103/physrevlett.97.061302. PMID 17026156.
- Freidel, L.; Krasnov, K. (2008). "A new spin foam model for 4D gravity". Classical and Quantum Gravity. 25 (12) 125018. arXiv:0708.1595. Bibcode:2008CQGra..25l5018F. doi:10.1088/0264-9381/25/12/125018. S2CID 119138842.
- Freidel, Laurent (4 April 2008). "Reconstructing AdS/CFT". arXiv:0804.0632. Bibcode:2008arXiv0804.0632F.
- Freidel, Laurent; Speziale, Simone (2010). "Twistors to twisted geometries". Physical Review D. 82 (8) 084041. arXiv:1006.0199. Bibcode:2010PhRvD..82h4041F. doi:10.1103/PhysRevD.82.084041. S2CID 119292655.
- Frodden, Ernesto; Ghosh, Amit; Perez, Alejandro (2013). "Quasilocal first law for black hole thermodynamics". Physical Review D. 87 (12) 121503. arXiv:1110.4055. Bibcode:2013PhRvD..87l1503F. doi:10.1103/PhysRevD.87.121503. S2CID 56145555.
- Gambini, R.; Pullin, J. (2011). A First Course in Loop Quantum Gravity. Oxford University Press. ISBN 978-0-19-959075-9.
- Gambini, Rodolfo; Pullin, Jorge (2009). "Emergent diffeomorphism invariance in a discrete loop quantum gravity model". Classical and Quantum Gravity. 26 (3) 035002. arXiv:0807.2808. Bibcode:2009CQGra..26c5002G. doi:10.1088/0264-9381/26/3/035002. S2CID 118500639.
- Gambini, Rodolfo; Pullin, Jorge (2020). Loop Quantum Gravity for Everyone. World Scientific. doi:10.1142/11599. ISBN 978-981-12-1195-9. S2CID 202934669.
- Giesel, K.; Thiemann, T. (2007a). "Algebraic quantum gravity (AQG): I. Conceptual setup". Classical and Quantum Gravity. 24 (10): 2465–2498. arXiv:gr-qc/0607099. Bibcode:2007CQGra..24.2465G. doi:10.1088/0264-9381/24/10/003. S2CID 17907375.
- Giesel, K.; Thiemann, T. (2007b). "Algebraic quantum gravity (AQG): II. Semiclassical analysis". Classical and Quantum Gravity. 24 (10): 2499–2564. arXiv:gr-qc/0607100. Bibcode:2007CQGra..24.2499G. doi:10.1088/0264-9381/24/10/004. S2CID 88507130.
- Giesel, K.; Thiemann, T. (2007c). "Algebraic quantum gravity (AQG): III. Semiclassical perturbation theory". Classical and Quantum Gravity. 24 (10): 2565–2588. arXiv:gr-qc/0607101. Bibcode:2007CQGra..24.2565G. doi:10.1088/0264-9381/24/10/005. S2CID 17728576.
- Goswami; Joshi, Pankaj S.; Singh, Parampreet; et al. (2006). "Quantum evaporation of a naked singularity". Physical Review Letters. 96 (3) 31302. arXiv:gr-qc/0506129. Bibcode:2006PhRvL..96c1302G. doi:10.1103/PhysRevLett.96.031302. PMID 16486681. S2CID 19851285.
- Han, Muxin (2010). "A path integral for the master constraint of loop quantum gravity". Classical and Quantum Gravity. 27 (21) 215009. arXiv:0911.3432. Bibcode:2010CQGra..27u5009H. doi:10.1088/0264-9381/27/21/215009. S2CID 118610209.
- Han, Muxin; Thiemann, Thomas (2010a). "On the relation between operator constraint, master constraint, reduced phase space and path integral quantization". Classical and Quantum Gravity. 27 (22) 225019. arXiv:0911.3428. Bibcode:2010CQGra..27v5019H. doi:10.1088/0264-9381/27/22/225019. S2CID 119262615.
- Han, Muxin; Thiemann, Thomas (2010b). "On the relation between rigging inner product and master constraint direct integral decomposition". Journal of Mathematical Physics. 51 (9): 092501. arXiv:0911.3431. Bibcode:2010JMP....51i2501H. doi:10.1063/1.3486359. S2CID 115176353.
- Jammer, M. (1989). The Conceptual Development of Quantum Mechanics (2nd ed.). Tomash Publishers. Section 3.2. ISBN 978-0-88318-617-6.
- Kauffman, S.; Smolin, L. (7 April 1997). "A Possible Solution For The Problem Of Time In Quantum Cosmology". Edge.org. Archived from the original on 1 January 2019.
- Kribs, D. W.; Markopoulou, F. (11 October 2005). "Geometry from quantum particles". arXiv:gr-qc/0510052.
- Lewandowski, J.; Okołów, A.; Sahlmann, H.; Thiemann, T. (2006). "Uniqueness of Diffeomorphism Invariant States on Holonomy-Flux Algebras". Communications in Mathematical Physics. 267 (3): 703–733. arXiv:gr-qc/0504147. Bibcode:2006CMaPh.267..703L. doi:10.1007/s00220-006-0100-7. S2CID 14866220.
- Livine, E.; Speziale, S. (2008). "Consistently Solving the Simplicity Constraints for Spinfoam Quantum Gravity". EPL. 81 (5) 50004. arXiv:0708.1915. Bibcode:2008EL.....8150004L. doi:10.1209/0295-5075/81/50004. S2CID 119718476.
- Majumdar, Parthasarathi (1998). "Black Hole Entropy and Quantum Gravity". Indian Journal of Physics. 73 (2): 147. arXiv:gr-qc/9807045. Bibcode:1999InJPB..73..147M.
- Modesto, Leonardo; Rovelli, Carlo (2005). "Particle Scattering in Loop Quantum Gravity". Physical Review Letters. 95 (19) 191301. arXiv:gr-qc/0502036. Bibcode:2005PhRvL..95s1301M. doi:10.1103/PhysRevLett.95.191301. PMID 16383970. S2CID 46705469.
- Muxin, H. (2011). "Cosmological constant in loop quantum gravity vertex amplitude". Physical Review D. 84 (6) 064010. arXiv:1105.2212. Bibcode:2011PhRvD..84f4010H. doi:10.1103/PhysRevD.84.064010. S2CID 119144559.
- Nicolai, Hermann; Peeters, Kasper; Zamaklar, Marija (2005). "Loop quantum gravity: an outside view". Classical and Quantum Gravity. 22 (19): R193–R247. arXiv:hep-th/0501114. Bibcode:2005CQGra..22R.193N. doi:10.1088/0264-9381/22/19/R01. S2CID 14106366.
- Oeckl, Robert (2003a). "A "general boundary" formulation for quantum mechanics and quantum gravity". Physics Letters B. 575 (3–4): 318–324. arXiv:hep-th/0306025. Bibcode:2003PhLB..575..318O. doi:10.1016/j.physletb.2003.08.043. S2CID 119485193.
- Oeckl, Robert (2003b). "Schrödinger's cat and the clock: Lessons for quantum gravity". Classical and Quantum Gravity. 20 (24): 5371–5380. arXiv:gr-qc/0306007. Bibcode:2003CQGra..20.5371O. doi:10.1088/0264-9381/20/24/009. S2CID 118978523.
- "Renate Loll". Perimeter Institute for Theoretical Physics.
- Rovelli, Carlo (2004). Quantum Gravity. Cambridge Monographs on Mathematical Physics. pp. 13ff. ISBN 978-0-521-83733-0.
- Rovelli, Carlo (2011). "Zakopane lectures on loop gravity". arXiv:1102.3660 [gr-qc].
- Rovelli, C.; Alesci, E. (2007). "The complete LQG propagator I. Difficulties with the Barrett–Crane vertex". Physical Review D. 76 (2) 104012. arXiv:0708.0883. Bibcode:2007PhRvD..76j4012A. doi:10.1103/PhysRevD.76.104012. S2CID 18845501.
- Rovelli, Carlo; Smolin, Lee (1988). "Knot Theory and Quantum Gravity". Physical Review Letters. 61 (10): 1155–1158. Bibcode:1988PhRvL..61.1155R. doi:10.1103/PhysRevLett.61.1155. PMID 10038716.
- Rovelli, Carlo (1996). "Black Hole Entropy from Loop Quantum Gravity". Physical Review Letters. 77 (16): 3288–3291. arXiv:gr-qc/9603063. Bibcode:1996PhRvL..77.3288R. doi:10.1103/PhysRevLett.77.3288. PMID 10062183. S2CID 43493308.
- Rovelli, Carlo (2003). "A Dialog on Quantum Gravity". International Journal of Modern Physics D. 12 (9): 1509–1528. arXiv:hep-th/0310077. Bibcode:2003IJMPD..12.1509R. doi:10.1142/S0218271803004304. S2CID 119406493.
- Rovelli, Carlo (August 2008). "Loop Quantum Gravity" (PDF). Living Reviews in Relativity. 11 (1) 5. Bibcode:2008LRR....11....5R. doi:10.12942/lrr-2008-5. PMC 5256093. PMID 28179822.
- Rovelli, Carlo; Vidotto, Francesca (2014). "Planck stars". International Journal of Modern Physics D. 23 (12): 1442026. arXiv:1401.6562. Bibcode:2014IJMPD..2342026R. doi:10.1142/S0218271814420267. S2CID 118917980.
- Smolin, Lee (2006). "The Case for Background Independence". In Rickles, D.; French, S.; Saatsi, J. T. (eds.). The Structural Foundations of Quantum Gravity. Clarendon Press. pp. 196ff. arXiv:hep-th/0507235. Bibcode:2005hep.th....7235S. ISBN 978-0-19-926969-3.
- Smolin, Lee (20 January 2010). "Newtonian gravity in loop quantum gravity". arXiv:1001.3668. Bibcode:2010arXiv1001.3668S.
- Speziale, S.; Wieland, W. (2012). "The twistorial structure of loop-gravity transition amplitudes". Physical Review D. 86 (12) 124023. arXiv:1207.6348. Bibcode:2012PhRvD..86l4023S. doi:10.1103/PhysRevD.86.124023. S2CID 59406729.
- Thiemann, Thomas (1996). "Anomaly-free formulation of non-perturbative, four-dimensional Lorentzian quantum gravity". Physics Letters B. 380 (3–4): 257–264. arXiv:gr-qc/9606088. Bibcode:1996PhLB..380..257T. doi:10.1016/0370-2693(96)00532-1. S2CID 8691449.
- Thiemann, Thomas (2003). "Lectures on Loop Quantum Gravity". Quantum Gravity. Lecture Notes in Physics. Vol. 631. pp. 41–135. arXiv:gr-qc/0210094. Bibcode:2003LNP...631...41T. doi:10.1007/978-3-540-45230-0_3. ISBN 978-3-540-40810-9. S2CID 119151491.
- Thiemann, Thomas (2006a). "The Phoenix Project: Master constraint programme for loop quantum gravity". Classical and Quantum Gravity. 23 (7): 2211–2247. arXiv:gr-qc/0305080. Bibcode:2006CQGra..23.2211T. doi:10.1088/0264-9381/23/7/002. S2CID 16304158.
- Thiemann, Thomas (2006b). "Quantum spin dynamics: VIII. The master constraint". Classical and Quantum Gravity. 23 (7): 2249–2265. arXiv:gr-qc/0510011. Bibcode:2006CQGra..23.2249T. doi:10.1088/0264-9381/23/7/003. S2CID 29095312.
- Thiemann, Thomas (2008). Modern Canonical General Relativity. Cambridge Monographs on Mathematical Physics. Cambridge University Press. Section 10.6. ISBN 978-0-521-74187-3.
- Tipler, P.; Llewellyn, R. (2008). Modern Physics (5th ed.). W. H. Freeman and Co. pp. 160–161. ISBN 978-0-7167-7550-8.
