= Andrzej Trautman =

Polish mathematical physicist (1933–2026)

- Born: 4 January 1933; Warsaw, Poland
- Died: 27 February 2026 (aged 93)
- Education: Warsaw University of Technology
- Known for: Robinson–Trautman gravitational waves Trautman recovery theorem in Newton–Cartan theory
- Spouse: Róża Michalska
- Children: 2 sons: Paweł, Krzysztof
- Awards: Marian Smoluchowski Medal (1986); Prize of the Foundation for Polish Science (2017)
- Scientific career
- Fields: Mathematics, Theoretical physics
- Workplaces: University of Warsaw
- Doctoral advisor: Leopold Infeld
- Doctoral students: Jerzy Lewandowski

Andrzej Mariusz Trautman (Polish: [ˈtrauman]; 4 January 1933 – 27 February 2026) was a Polish mathematical physicist who has made contributions to classical gravitation in general and to general relativity in particular.

Trautman made contributions to gravitation as early as 1958. The "Trautman-Bondi mass" is named after him.

== Life and career ==
Trautman was born in Warsaw, Poland on 4 January 1933, into an artistic family. His father, Mieczysław, was a painter and taught drawing at a secondary school in Warsaw. His mother, Eliza Trautman (née André), was French, though she was born in Spain, where her father, Marius André, was working as a French consular officer. His schooling, at the elementary level, was interrupted by the Warsaw Uprising of 1944. After spending about ten months in Germany, he returned, with his mother (his father had died in 1941) to Poland. In the fall of 1945, they both went to Paris, to stay with their family there. In France, Trautman attended a Polish secondary school from which he graduated in 1949 and returned to Poland shortly afterwards.

During the years 1949–55, he studied radio engineering at the Warsaw University of Technology where he earned his master's degree. Trautman continued the graduate work under the influence of Jerzy Plebański, in Leopold Infeld's group at the Institute of Theoretical Physics of the University of Warsaw. This Institute was to become his permanent place of study and work. In 1959, he obtained his PhD degree at the Institute of Physics of the Polish Academy of Sciences in Warsaw. In 1961, Trautman and his colleague Róża Michalska spent a few months at Syracuse University, at the invitation of Peter G. Bergmann. The next year, Róża and Andrzej married in Kraków.

Trautman and Ivor Robinson discovered a family of exact solutions of the Einstein field equations, the Robinson–Trautman gravitational waves.

In 1977, Trautman identified the Dirac monopole with the Hopf fibration.

In 1981, Trautman became a founding member of the World Cultural Council.

Trautman died on 27 February 2026, at the age of 93.
