= Group field theory =

Quantum field theory with a Lie group base manifold

Group field theory (GFT) is a quantum field theory in which the base manifold is taken to be a Lie group. It is closely related to background independent quantum gravity approaches such as loop quantum gravity, the spin foam formalism and causal dynamical triangulation. Its perturbative expansion can be interpreted as spin foams and simplicial pseudo-manifolds (depending on the representation of the fields). Thus, its partition function defines a non-perturbative sum over all simplicial topologies and geometries, giving a path integral formulation of quantum spacetime.

== See also ==
- Shape dynamics
- Causal Sets
- Fractal cosmology
- Loop quantum gravity
- Planck scale
- Quantum gravity
- Regge calculus
- Simplex
- Simplicial manifold
- Spin foam
