= Ashtekar variables =

Variables used in general relativity

In the ADM formulation of general relativity, spacetime is split into spatial slices and a time axis. The basic variables are taken to be the induced metric $q_{ab} (x)$ on the spatial slice and the metric's conjugate momentum $K^{ab} (x)$, which is related to the extrinsic curvature and is a measure of how the induced metric evolves in time. These are the metric canonical coordinates.

In 1986 Abhay Ashtekar introduced a new set of canonical variables, Ashtekar (new) variables to represent an unusual way of rewriting the metric canonical variables on the three-dimensional spatial slices in terms of an SU(2) gauge field and its complementary variable.

== Overview ==
Ashtekar variables provide what is called the connection representation of canonical general relativity, which led to the loop representation of quantum general relativity and in turn loop quantum gravity and quantum holonomy theory.

Let us introduce a set of three vector fields $\ E^a_j\ ,$ $\ j = 1,2,3\$ that are orthogonal, that is,

$$\delta_{jk} = q_{ab}\ E_j^a\ E_k^b ~.$$

The $\ E_i^a\$ are called a triad or drei-bein (German literal translation, "three-leg"). There are now two different types of indices, "space" indices $\ a,b,c\$ that behave like regular indices in a curved space, and "internal" indices $\ j,k,\ell\$ which behave like indices of flat-space (the corresponding "metric" which raises and lowers internal indices is simply $\ \delta_{jk}\$). Define the dual drei-bein $\ E^j_a\$ as

$$\ E^j_a = q_{ab}\ E^b_j ~.$$

We then have the two orthogonality relationships

$$\ \delta^{jk} = q^{ab}\ E^j_a\ E^k_b\ ,$$

where $q^{ab}$ is the inverse matrix of the metric $\ q_{ab}\$ (this comes from substituting the formula for the dual drei-bein in terms of the drei-bein into $\ q^{ab}\ E^j_a\ E^k_b\$ and using the orthogonality of the drei-beins).

and

$$\ E_j^a\ E^j_b\ = \delta_b^a\$$

(this comes about from contracting $\ \delta_{jk} = q_{ab}\ E_k^b\ E_j^a\$ with $\ E^j_c\$ and using the linear independence of the $\ E_a^k\$). It is then easy to verify from the first orthogonality relation, employing $\ E_j^a\ E^j_b = \delta_b^a\ ,$ that

$$\ q^{ab} ~=~ \sum_{j,\ k=1}^{3}\; \delta_{jk}\ E_j^a\ E_k^b ~=~ \sum_{j=1}^{3}\; E_j^a\ E_j^b\ ,$$

we have obtained a formula for the inverse metric in terms of the drei-beins. The drei-beins can be thought of as the 'square-root' of the metric (the physical meaning to this is that the metric $\ q^{ab}\ ,$ when written in terms of a basis $\ E_j^a\ ,$ is locally flat). Actually what is really considered is

$$\ \left( \mathrm{det} (q) \right)\ q^{ab} ~=~ \sum_{j=1}^{3}\; \tilde{E}_j^a\ \tilde{E}_j^b\ ,$$

which involves the "densitized" drei-bein $\tilde{E}_i^a$ instead (densitized as $\ \tilde{E}_j^a = \sqrt{ \det (q)\ }\ E_j^a\$). One recovers from $\ \tilde{E}_j^a\$ the metric times a factor given by its determinant. It is clear that $\ \tilde{E}_j^a\$ and $\ E_j^a\$ contain the same information, just rearranged. Now the choice for $\ \tilde{E}_j^a\$ is not unique, and in fact one can perform a local-in-space rotation with respect to the internal indices $\ j\$ without changing the (inverse) metric. This is the origin of the $\ \mathrm{ SU(2) }\$ gauge invariance. Now if one is going to operate on objects that have internal indices, one needs to introduce an appropriate derivative (covariant derivative), for example the covariant derivative for the object $\ V_i^b\$ will be

$$\ D_a\ V_j^b = \partial_a V_j^b - \Gamma_{a \;\; j}^{\;\; k}\ V_k^b + \Gamma^b_{ac}\ V_j^c\$$

where $\ \Gamma^b_{ac}\$ is the usual Levi-Civita connection and $\ \Gamma_{a \;\; j}^{\;\; k}\$ is the so-called spin connection. Let us take the configuration variable to be

$$\ A_a^j = \Gamma_a^j + \beta\ K_a^j\$$

where $\Gamma_a^j = \Gamma_{ak\ell}\ \epsilon^{k \ell j}$ and $K_a^j = K_{ab}\ \tilde{E}^{bj} / \sqrt{\det (q)\ } ~.$ The densitized drei-bein is the conjugate momentum variable of this three-dimensional SU(2) gauge field (or connection) $\ A^k_b\ ,$ in that it satisfies the Poisson bracket relation

$$\ \{\ \tilde{E}_j^a (x) ,\ A^k_b (y)\ \} = 8\pi\ G_\mathsf{Newton}\ \beta\ \delta^a_b\ \delta^k_j\ \delta^3 (x - y) ~.$$

The constant $\beta$ is the Immirzi parameter, a factor that renormalizes Newton's constant $\ G_\mathsf{Newton} ~.$ The densitized drei-bein can be used to reconstruct the metric as discussed above, and the connection can be used to reconstruct the extrinsic curvature. Ashtekar variables correspond to the choice $\ \beta = -i\$ (the negative of the imaginary number, $\ i\$); $\ A_a^j\$ is then called the chiral spin connection.

The reason for this choice of spin connection was that Ashtekar could much simplify the most troublesome equation of canonical general relativity – namely the Hamiltonian constraint of LQG. This choice made its formidable second term vanish, and the remaining term became polynomial in his new variables. This simplification raised new hopes for the canonical quantum gravity programme. However, it did present certain difficulties: Although Ashtekar variables had the virtue of simplifying the Hamiltonian, it has the problem that the variables become complex. When one quantizes the theory it is a difficult task to ensure that one recovers real general relativity, as opposed to complex general relativity. Also the Hamiltonian constraint Ashtekar worked with was the densitized version, instead of the original Hamiltonian; that is, he worked with $\tilde{H} = \sqrt{\det (q)} H ~.$

There were serious difficulties in promoting this quantity to a quantum operator. In 1996 Thomas Thiemann was able to use a generalization of Ashtekar's formalism to real connections ($\beta$ takes real values) and in particular devised a way of simplifying the original Hamiltonian, together with the second term. He was also able to promote this Hamiltonian constraint to a well defined quantum operator within the loop representation.

Lee Smolin & Ted Jacobson, and Joseph Samuel, independently discovered that there exists in fact a Lagrangian formulation of the theory by considering the self-dual formulation of the tetradic Palatini action principle of general relativity. These proofs were given in terms of spinors. A purely tensorial proof of the new variables in terms of triads was given by Goldberg and in terms of tetrads by Henneaux, Nelson, & Schomblond (1989).
