= Riemannian submanifold =

The sphere $S^n$ with the round metric is a Riemannian submanifold of $\mathbb R^{n+1}$.

A Riemannian submanifold $N$ of a Riemannian manifold $M$ is a submanifold $N$ of $M$ equipped with the Riemannian metric inherited (induced) from $M$.

Specifically, if $(M,g)$ is a Riemannian manifold (with or without boundary) and $i : N \to M$ is an immersed submanifold or an embedded submanifold (with or without boundary), the pullback $i^* g$ of $g$ is a Riemannian metric on $N$, and $(N, i^*g)$ is said to be a Riemannian submanifold of $(M,g)$. On the other hand, if $N$ already has a Riemannian metric $\tilde g$, then the immersion (or embedding) $i : N \to M$ is called an isometric immersion (or isometric embedding) if $\tilde g = i^* g$. Hence isometric immersions and isometric embeddings are Riemannian submanifolds.

For example, the n-sphere $S^n = \{ x \in \mathbb R^{n+1} : \lVert x \rVert = 1 \}$ is an embedded Riemannian submanifold of $\mathbb R^{n+1}$ via the inclusion map $S^n \hookrightarrow \mathbb R^{n+1}$ that takes a point in $S^n$ to the corresponding point in the superset $\mathbb R^{n+1}$. The induced metric on $S^n$ is called the round metric.
