= Noiseless subsystems =

The framework of noiseless subsystems has been developed as a tool to preserve fragile quantum information against decoherence. In brief, when a quantum register (a Hilbert space) is subjected to decoherence due to an interaction with an external and uncontrollable environment, information stored in the register is, in general, degraded. It has been shown that when the source of decoherence exhibits some symmetries, certain subsystems of the quantum register are unaffected by the interactions with the environment and are thus noiseless. These noiseless subsystems are therefore very natural and robust tools that can be used for processing quantum information.

== See also ==
- Decoherence-free subspaces
