= Jerzy Lewandowski =

Polish physicist (1959–2024)

- Born: 15 September 1959
- Died: 8 October 2024 (aged 65)
- Known for: Loop quantum gravity
- Scientific career
- Fields: Theoretical physics, general relativity, quantum gravity
- Workplaces: University of Warsaw
- Doctoral advisor: Andrzej Trautman

Jerzy Lewandowski (Polish: [lɛvanˈdɔfskʲi]; 15 September 1959 – 8 October 2024) was a Polish theoretical physicist best known for his extensive research into general relativity and quantum gravity.

== Biography ==
Lewandowski was professor of physics at the University of Warsaw. He received his doctorate in Warsaw under Andrzej Trautman. He worked closely with Abhay Ashtekar at Pennsylvania State University in the 1990s on the mathematical justification of Loop Quantum Gravity (LQG). Among other things, he was at the Erwin Schrödinger Institute in Vienna and at the Max Planck Institute for Gravitational Physics in Golm near Potsdam.

He dealt with cosmological models and the entropy of black holes in the LQG. In 2010 he and his colleagues investigated a scalar field together with the gravitational field as part of LQG and were able to show the origin of a time as the ratio of the scalar to the gravitational field, and the quantization of the gravitational field.

Lewandowski died on 8 October 2024, at the age of 65.

== Publications ==
- With Ashtekar Background independent quantum gravity: a status report, Classical and Quantum Gravity, Band 21, 2004, R 53 Arxiv
- Abhay Ashtekar, Jerzy Lewandowski, Donald Marolf, Jose Mourao, Thomas Thiemann Quantization of diffeomorphism invariant theories of connections with local degrees of freedom, J. Mathematical Physics, Band 36, 1995, S. 6456–6493, Arxiv
- With Ashtekar Quantum theory of Gravity I. Area Operators, Classical and Quantum Gravity, Band 14, 1997, A 55–82, Arxiv, Volume II: Volume Operators, Arxiv
- With Martin Bojowald, Ashtekar Mathematical structure of loop quantum cosmology, Adv.Theor.Math.Phys., Band 7, 2003, S. 233–268, Arxiv
