= Induced metric =

Submanifold metric tensor

In mathematics and theoretical physics, the induced metric is the metric tensor defined on a submanifold that is induced from the metric tensor on a manifold into which the submanifold is embedded, through the pullback. It may be determined using the following formula (using the Einstein summation convention), which is the component form of the pullback operation:

$$g_{ab} = \partial_a X^\mu \partial_b X^\nu  g_{\mu\nu}\$$

Here $a$, $b$ describe the indices of coordinates $\xi^a$ of the submanifold while the functions $X^\mu(\xi^a)$ encode the embedding into the higher-dimensional manifold whose tangent indices are denoted $\mu$, $\nu$.

== Example – Curve in 3D ==
Let

$$\Pi\colon \mathcal{C} \to \mathbb{R}^3,\ \tau \mapsto \begin{cases}\begin{align}x^1&= (a+b\cos(n\cdot \tau))\cos(m\cdot \tau)\\x^2&=(a+b\cos(n\cdot \tau))\sin(m\cdot \tau)\\x^3&=b\sin(n\cdot \tau).\end{align} \end{cases}$$

be a map from the domain of the curve $\mathcal{C}$ with parameter $\tau$ into the Euclidean manifold $\mathbb{R}^3$. Here $a,b,m,n\in\mathbb{R}$ are constants.

Then there is a metric given on $\mathbb{R}^3$ as

$$g=\sum\limits_{\mu,\nu}g_{\mu\nu}\mathrm{d}x^\mu\otimes \mathrm{d}x^\nu\quad\text{with}\quad
g_{\mu\nu} = \begin{pmatrix}1 & 0 & 0\\0 & 1 & 0\\0 & 0 & 1\end{pmatrix}$$.

and we compute

$$g_{\tau\tau}=\sum\limits_{\mu,\nu}\frac{\partial x^\mu}{\partial \tau}\frac{\partial x^\nu}{\partial \tau}\underbrace{g_{\mu\nu}}_{\delta_{\mu\nu}} = \sum\limits_\mu\left(\frac{\partial x^\mu}{\partial \tau}\right)^2=m^2 a^2+2m^2ab\cos(n\cdot \tau)+m^2b^2\cos^2(n\cdot \tau)+b^2n^2$$

Therefore $g_\mathcal{C}=(m^2 a^2+2m^2ab\cos(n\cdot \tau)+m^2b^2\cos^2(n\cdot \tau)+b^2n^2) \, \mathrm{d}\tau\otimes \mathrm{d}\tau$

== See also ==
- First fundamental form
- Riemannian submanifold
