= Black hole cosmology =

Cosmological model in which the observable universe is the interior of a black hole

A black hole cosmology, or Schwarzschild cosmology, is a cosmological model in which the observable universe is the interior of a black hole.

During gravitational collapse of most massive stars and centers of galaxies, a black hole forms. The matter in a black hole continues to contract. It is speculated that at extremely high densities, much greater than the density of nuclear matter, torsion or another mechanism limiting curvature might prevent the matter from compressing indefinitely to a singularity. Instead, the collapsing matter reaches a state with an extremely large but finite density, stops collapsing, undergoes a bounce, and starts rapidly expanding.

According to such scenarios, our observable universe was born in a black hole existing in a larger universe, where this black hole may, at some point, appear as a white hole. Rather than a Big Bang starting from a singularity, there is instead a non-singular Big Bounce, at which the Universe had a non-zero, minimum scale factor. In some such models, all universes created by black holes form a multiverse.

== History and various models ==
This model was originally proposed in 1972 by Raj Pathria, who compared the Schwarzschild metric with the closed Friedmann–Lemaître–Robertson–Walker metric at the maximum scale factor. Subsequent studies analyzed a universe in a black hole by matching the Schwarzschild metric outside the black hole with either a de Sitter space inside the black hole, on the assumption that some limiting curvature exists, or with a Friedmann space. The scenarios in which the universe is formed in the interior of a black hole might naturally solve the horizon problem and flatness problem in cosmology.

=== Limiting curvature hypothesis ===
Limiting curvature hypothesis, proposed by Valeri Frolov, Moisey Markov, and Viatcheslav Mukhanov in 1989, assumed the existence of an upper limit on the curvature invariants, which prevents gravitational singularities. It was used to impose matching between the Schwarzschild metric outside a black hole and a de Sitter metric inside the black hole.

=== Baby universes in black holes ===
Sidney Coleman hypothesized in 1988 that quantum spacetime fluctuations could create baby universes which disconnect from the universe in which they exist. The idea that baby universes form in black holes, which could solve the black hole information paradox, was popularized in 1993 by Stephen Hawking.

=== Cosmological natural selection ===
Lee Smolin proposed in 1992 that all final singularities bounce or tunnel to initial singularities of new universes, at which point the dimensionless parameters of the standard models of particle physics and cosmology can undergo small random changes, providing a mechanism for cosmological natural selection.

=== Shockwave cosmology ===
In this model proposed by Joel Smoller and Blake Temple in 2003, the Big Bang is an explosion inside a black hole, producing the expanding volume of space and matter that includes the observable universe. This model integrates shock waves into Einstein's general relativity.

=== Non-singular torsion Big Bounce ===
Nikodem Popławski proposed in 2010 the first physically grounded mechanism for every black hole to avoid a gravitational singularity during gravitational collapse, undergo a non-singular gravitational bounce, and consequently create a new, expanding universe inside its event horizon. This mechanism is based on general relativity with spin and torsion, also known as the Einstein–Cartan–Sciama–Kibble theory of gravity, proposed by Élie Cartan, Dennis Sciama, and Thomas Kibble. Torsion, introduced by Cartan, is a geometric property of spacetime describing the deviation of a parallelogram spanned by two vectors from forming a closed curve, and can be viewed as twisting of spacetime (analogously to curvature which describes bending of spacetime). The existence of torsion is required for general relativity to be consistent with the conservation of the total (orbital plus spin) angular momentum of a free particle satisfying the Dirac equation in curved spacetime. Fermions are the source of torsion, generating a repulsive spin-spin interaction, which prevents the formation of singularities. Quantum particle production strengthens this interaction, naturally generating a finite period of exponential expansion, known as cosmic inflation. A non-singular bounce also occurs for non-spherical black holes.

The Einstein–Cartan theory has the same Lagrangian for the gravitational field as general relativity but without the condition that the affine connection be symmetric. Fermions, described by Dirac spinor fields, are the source of torsion, generating a repulsive spin-spin interaction, which becomes strong at extremely high densities, naturally deriving a limiting curvature and preventing the formation of singularities. Accordingly, a black hole becomes a non-singular Einstein–Rosen bridge (the simplest wormhole) to a new, closed universe on the other side of its event horizon.

== Evidence ==
Both a black hole and the Big Bang have singularities, according to general relativity and the Penrose–Hawking theorems, which suggests that they may be related. Any model of the observable universe being the interior of a black hole requires that the Hubble radius of the universe be equal to its Schwarzschild radius, which is proportional to its mass. This is indeed observed to be nearly satisfied, but might be a coincidence.

Black holes and wormholes are different mathematical solutions of general relativity. The exteriors of both solutions with the same mass are indistinguishable for observers. The only way to test the idea that black holes create new universes is to measure the observable universe. Inflation generated by spin and torsion is consistent with the cosmic microwave background data from the Planck satellite.

A 2025 analysis of a sample of over 200 early galaxies observed by the James Webb Space Telescope showed that around two thirds spin clockwise, whereas only half would be expected to do so. One possible explanation for this anomaly is that the universe might be inside a rotating black hole; as all known black holes spin and this spin would manifest itself as a preferred axis in the universe, influencing all galaxies. Alternatively, the universe might spin slowly for some other reason, or there may be some problem with the data.

== See also ==
- Black hole
- Nonsingular black hole models
