= Nikodem Popławski =

Polish physicist (born 1975)

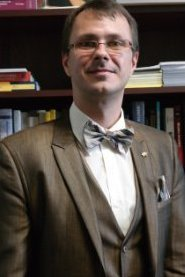
- Nikodem Popławski, 2015
- Born: 1 March 1975 (age 51); Toruń, Poland
- Education: Jagiellonian University; University of Warsaw; Indiana University
- Known for: Black-hole cosmology; White hole research Torsion regularization
- Scientific career
- Fields: Theoretical physics
- Workplaces: University of New Haven

Nikodem Janusz Popławski (born March 1, 1975) is a Polish theoretical physicist, most widely noted for the hypothesis that every black hole could be a doorway to another universe and that the universe was formed within a black hole which itself exists in a larger universe. This hypothesis was listed by National Geographic and Science magazines among their ten most-read stories of 2010.

== Black holes are edgeways ==
Popławski's approach is based on the Einstein–Cartan theory of gravity which extends general relativity to matter with intrinsic angular momentum (spin). Spin in curved spacetime requires that the affine connection cannot be constrained to zero and its antisymmetric part, the torsion tensor, must be a variable in Hamilton's principle of stationary action which gives the field equations. Torsion gives the correct generalization of the conservation law for the total (orbital plus intrinsic) angular momentum to the presence of the gravitational field, but also modifies the Dirac equation for fermions.

Gravitational effects of torsion on fermionic matter are significant at extremely high densities which exist inside black holes and at the beginning of the Universe. Popławski theorizes that torsion manifests itself as a repulsive force which causes fermions to be spatially extended and prevents the formation of a gravitational singularity within the black hole's event horizon. Because of torsion, the collapsing matter on the other side of the horizon reaches an enormous but finite density, explodes and rebounds, forming an Einstein-Rosen bridge (wormhole) to a new, closed, expanding universe. Quantum particle production in strong gravitational fields helps torsion to overcome shear. Analogously, the Big Bang is replaced by the Big Bounce before which the Universe was the interior of a black hole. This scenario generates cosmic inflation, which explains why the present Universe at largest scales appears spatially flat, homogeneous and isotropic. It may explain the arrow of time, solve the black hole information paradox, and explain the nature of dark matter. Torsion may also be responsible for the observed asymmetry between matter and antimatter in the Universe. The rotation of a black hole could influence the spacetime on the other side of its event horizon and result in a preferred direction in the new universe. Popławski suggests that the observed fluctuations in the cosmic microwave background might provide evidence for his hypothesis.

Popławski proposed that the momentum components do not commute in the presence of torsion. Accordingly, integration over the continuous momentum in Feynman diagrams is replaced with summation over the discrete momentum eigenvalues whose separation increases with magnitude. Consequently, divergent integrals in Feynman diagrams are replaced with convergent sums. Therefore, torsion might eliminate ultraviolet divergence and provide a physical mechanism for regularization in quantum field theory, giving finite values of bare quantities such as the mass and electric charge of the electron.

He also proposed that the four-velocity of a fermion (spinor) particle is related to its relativistic wave function. For a curved spacetime with torsion, the four-momentum of a spinor is related to a generator of translation, given by a covariant derivative, and the four-angular momentum is related to a generator of rotation in the Lorentz group. From the covariant conservation laws for the spin tensor and energy–momentum tensor for a spinor field in the presence of torsion, it follows that if the wave satisfies the curved Dirac equation, then the four-velocity, four-momentum, and four-spin satisfy the Mathisson–Papapetrou equations of motion, which reduce to the geodesic equation. Consequently, the motion of a particle guided by the four-velocity in the pilot wave interpretation of quantum mechanics coincides with the geodesic motion determined by spacetime, demonstrating a relativistic wave–particle duality.

== Education ==
Popławski received his M.Sc. degree in astronomy from the University of Warsaw (1999), and his Ph.D. degree in physics from Indiana University (2004), where he later worked as a lecturer and researcher in theoretical physics. He joined the Department of Mathematics and Physics at the University of New Haven as a senior lecturer in 2013 and became a distinguished lecturer in 2020.

== In popular culture ==
Popławski appeared in an episode of the TV show Through the Wormhole titled "Are There Parallel Universes?" (season 2) and in an episode of the Discovery Channel show Curiosity titled "Is There a Parallel Universe?", which aired in 2011.

== See also ==
- Cosmological natural selection
