= Valeri Frolov =

Valeri Frolov may refer to:

- Valeriy Frolov (general), Ukrainian general, commander of Ground Forces
- Valeri Frolov (footballer, born 1949), Russian football player and coach
- Valeri Frolov (footballer, born 1970), Russian football player
- Valeri Frolov (physicist) (born 1946), Russian-born Canadian physicist
