= Shockwave cosmology =

Non-standard model of the universe

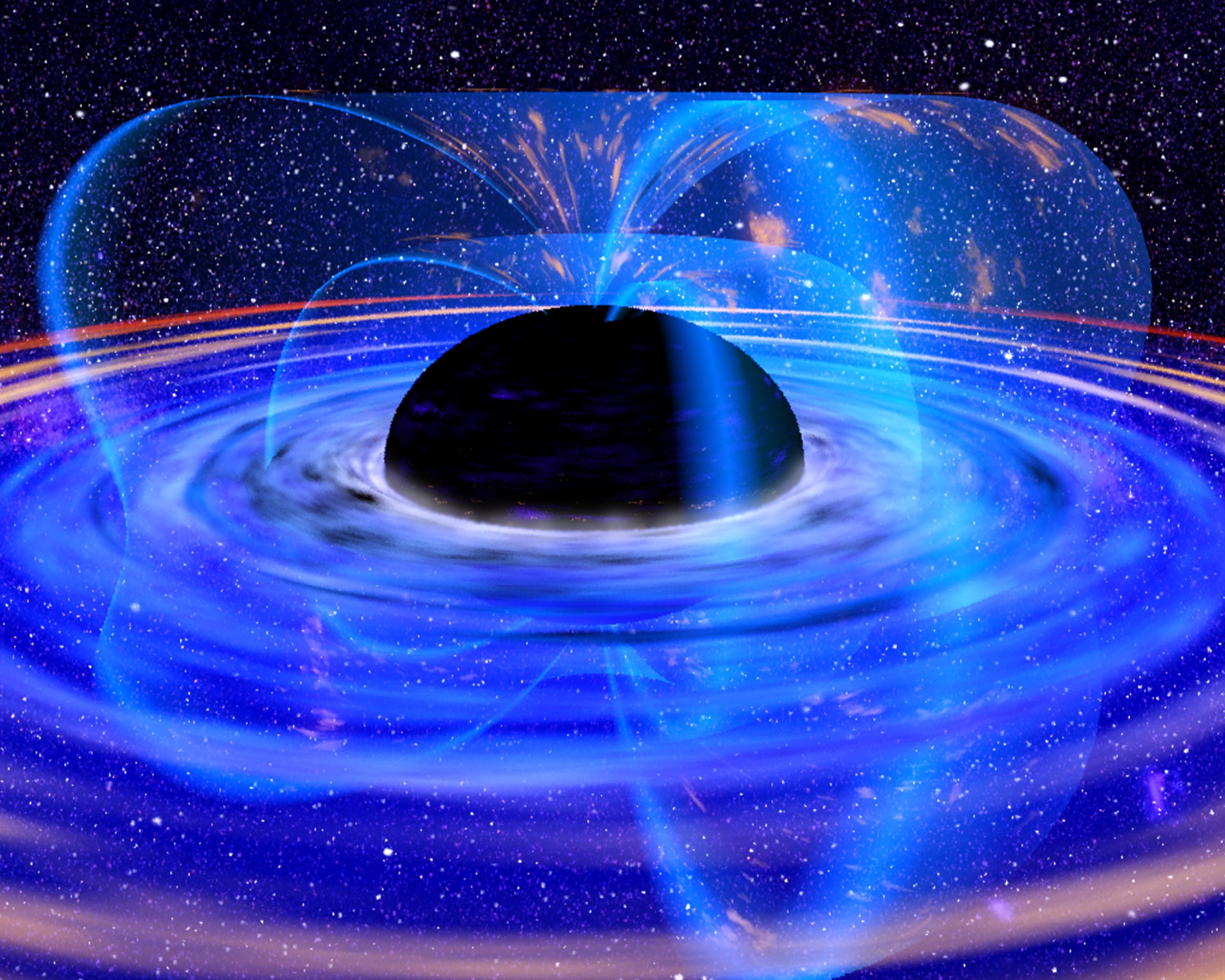
Black hole or island universe? (Image NASA)

Shockwave cosmology is a non-standard cosmology proposed by Joel Smoller and Blake Temple in 2003. In this model, the “big bang” is an explosion inside a black hole, producing the expanding volume of space and matter that includes the observable universe.

== Integration with general relativity ==
Smoller and Temple integrate shock waves into Einstein's general relativity. This produces a universe that "looks essentially identical to the aftermath of the big bang" according to cosmologists Barnes and Lewis. They explain that Smoller and Temple's version is distinguished from the big bang only by there being a shockwave at the leading edge of an explosion – one that, for Smoller and Temple's model, must be beyond the observable universe. However, Barnes and Lewis do not support shockwave cosmology because they see it as not testable; they point out that there is no explosion in the standard theory of the Big Bang.

== Current and future state of the universe ==
From Smoller and Temple's calculations, we are still inside an expanding black hole. The configuration of 'flat' spacetime (see Minkowski space) inside a black hole, also occurs during the moments of the formation of a black hole from a collapsing star.

Eventually, according to shockwave cosmology, the mass of our expanding volume of space and matter will fall in density as it expands. At some point, the event horizon of the black hole will cease to be. An outside observer will then see it appear as a white hole. The matter would then continue to expand.

== Alternative to dark energy ==
In related work, Smoller, Temple, and Vogler propose that this shockwave may have resulted in our part of the universe having a lower density than that surrounding it, causing the accelerated expansion normally attributed to dark energy.

They also propose that this related theory could be tested: a universe with dark energy should give a figure for the cubic correction to redshift versus luminosity C = −0.180 at a = a whereas for Smoller, Temple, and Vogler's alternative C should be positive rather than negative. They give a more precise calculation for their wave model alternative as: the cubic correction to redshift versus luminosity at a = a is C = 0.359.

== Comparison with standard cosmology ==
Although shockwave cosmology produces a universe that "looks essentially identical to the aftermath of the big bang", cosmologists consider that it needs further development before it could be considered as a more advantageous model than the big bang theory (or standard model) in explaining the universe. In particular, and especially for the proposed alternative to dark energy, it would need to explain big bang nucleosynthesis, the quantitative details of the microwave background anisotropies, the Lyman-alpha forest, and galaxy surveys.
