= NGC 7603 =

Galaxy in the constellation of Pisces

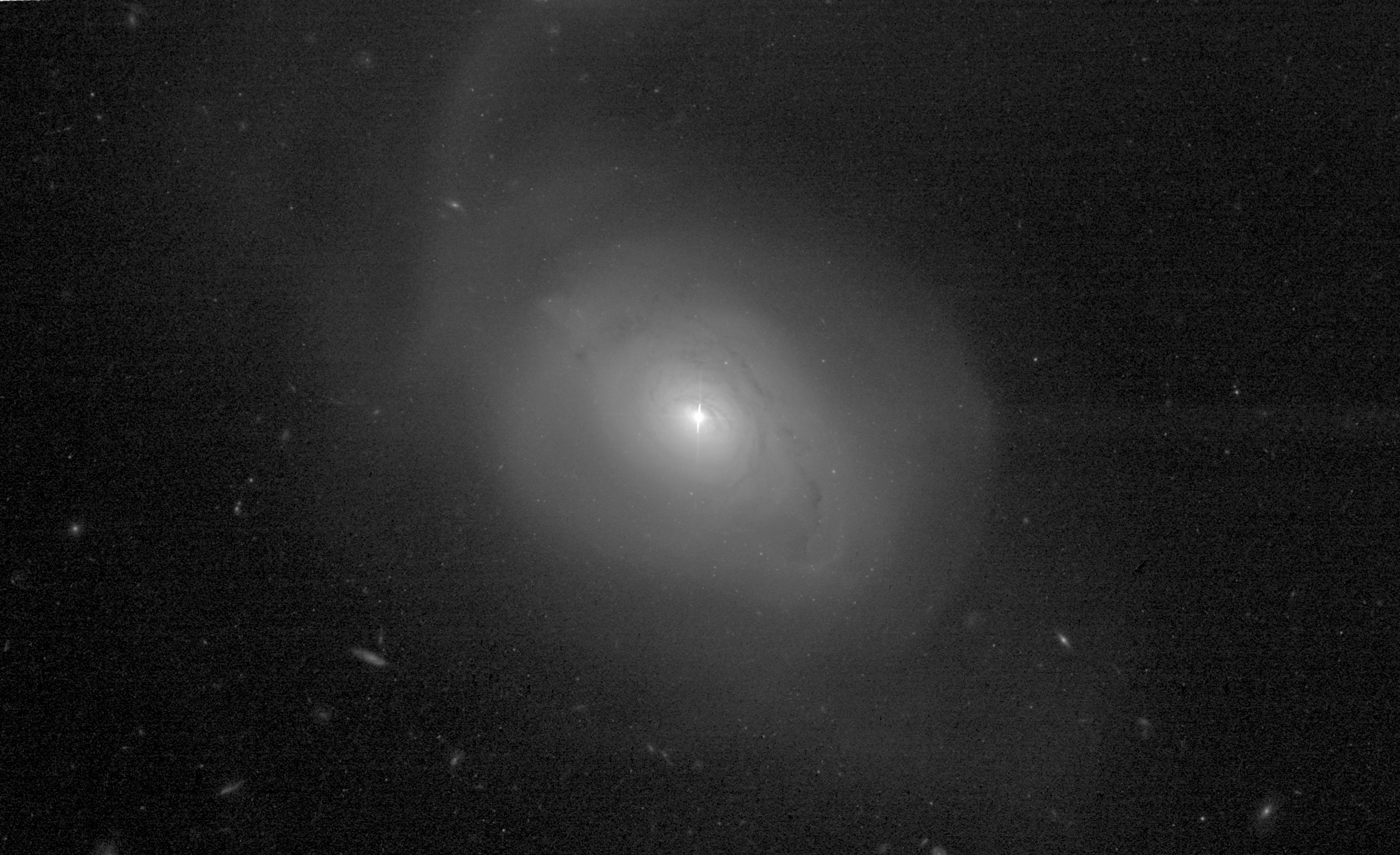
- The spiral Seyfert galaxy NGC 7603; Credit: Hubble Space Telescope

Observation data (J2000.0 epoch)
- Constellation: Pisces
- Right ascension: 23^{h} 18^{m} 56.4^{s}
- Declination: +00° 14′ 38.2″
- Redshift: 0.029524±0.000073
- Heliocentric radial velocity: 8851±22 km/s
- Galactocentric velocity: 8978±22 km/s
- Distance: 412.9 ± 28 Mly (126.60 ± 8.58 Mpc)
- Apparent magnitude (V): 14.04

Characteristics
- Type: SA(rs)b: pec Sy1.5
- Apparent size (V): 1.5 × 1.0 moa

Other designations
- NGC 7603, UGC 12493, MCG 0-59-21, MK 530, PGC 71035, IRAS23163-0001, UM 156, ARP 92, ZWG 380.26
- References: NGC+7603

NGC 7603 is a spiral Seyfert galaxy in the constellation Pisces. It is listed (as Arp 92) in the Atlas of Peculiar Galaxies. It is interacting with the smaller elliptical galaxy PGC 71041 nearby.

This galaxy pair has long been a cornerstone for those who are critical of the view that the universe is expanding, and advocates for non-standard cosmology such as Halton Arp, Fred Hoyle, and others. This is due to the position of two quasars, one at each edge of the filament connecting the two galaxies, with much more redshift than either galaxy.

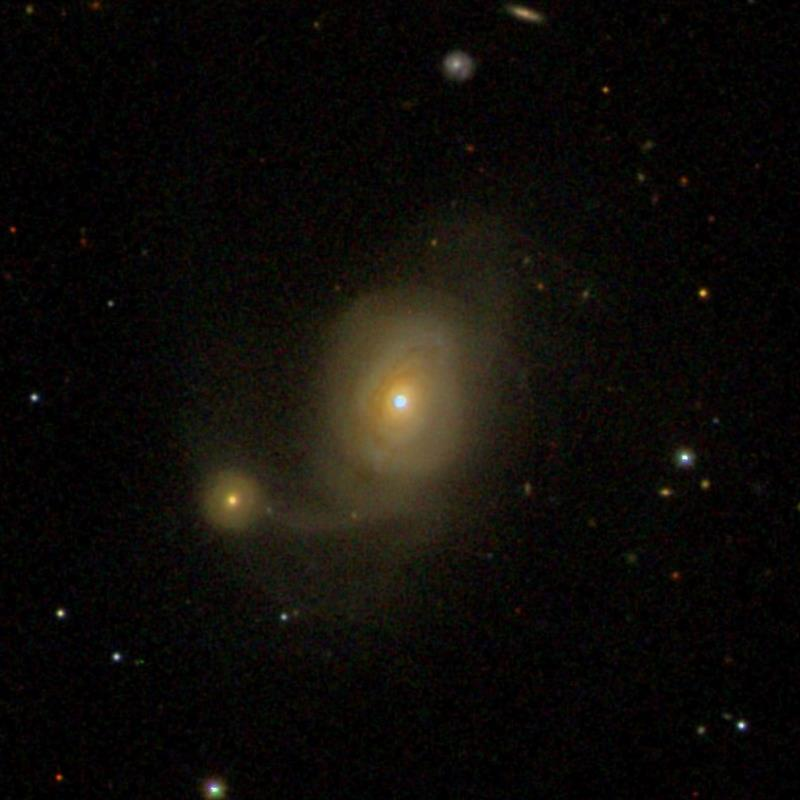
NGC 7603 (SDSS DR14)
