= Tsutomu Yanagida =

Japanese physicist

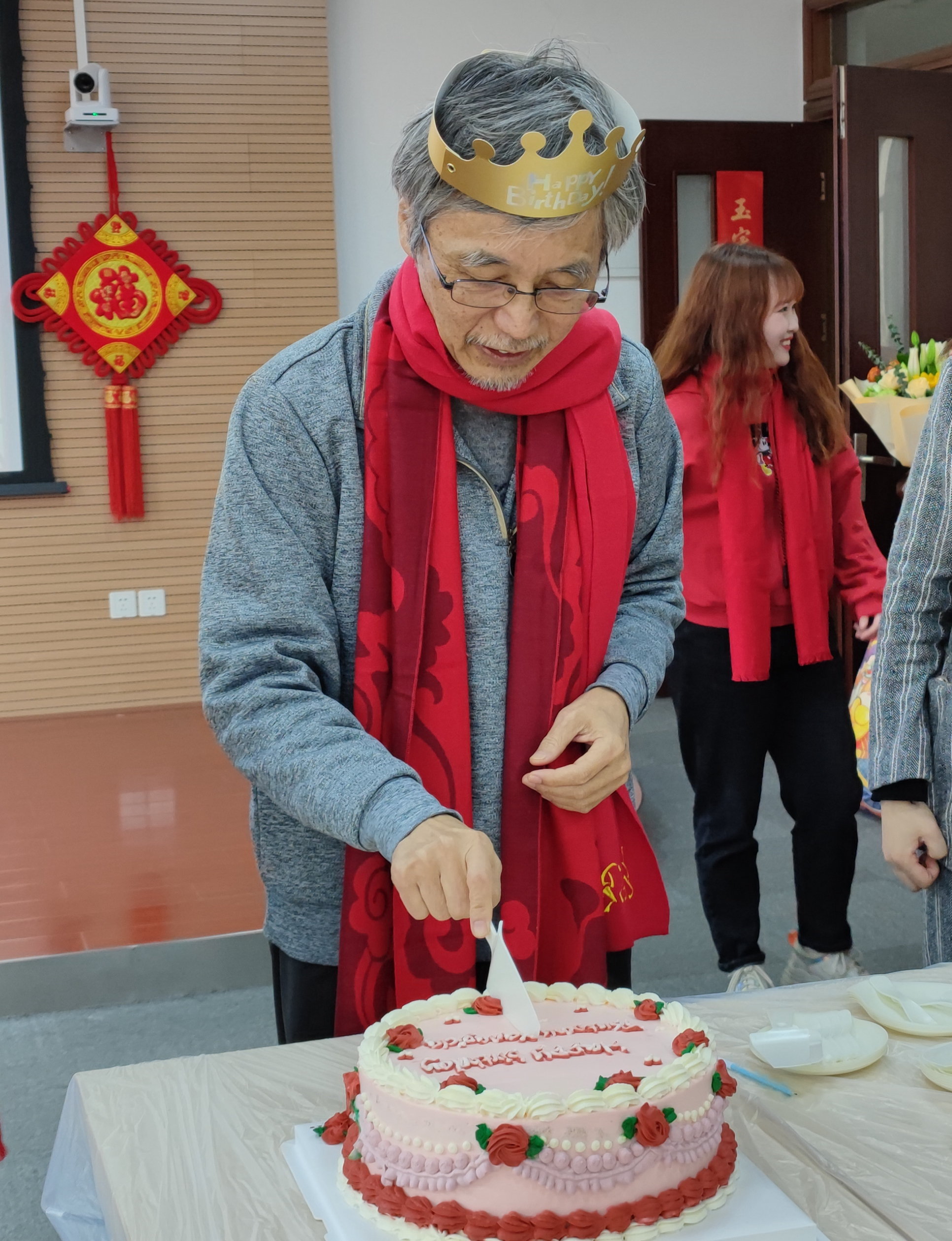
Tsutomu Yanagida in 2021

Tsutomu Yanagida is a Japanese physicist who first proposed the seesaw mechanism in 1979 and developed the model of leptogenesis. The name of the seesaw mechanism was given by him in a Tokyo conference in 1981. In 1994, he predicted, together with M. Fukugita, the nonzero cosmological constant Λ = (3 ± 1 meV)^{4} four years prior to the observation in order to resolve the age discrepancy between the Universe and some old stars.

Tsutomu Yanagida received a PhD in physics at Hiroshima University in 1977. In 1979, he proposed the seesaw mechanism, that explains the mass of neutrinos by introducing heavy right-handed neutrinos. Together with M. Fukugita, he developed the model of leptogenesis that traces the baryon asymmetry back to a lepton asymmetry. Till 2019 he was professor at Kavli Institute for Physics and Mathematics of the Universe at Tokyo University. Some of his students in Tokyo were Yasunori Nomura, Junji Hisano, and Takeo Moroi. In 2019, he was appointed professor at Shanghai Jiao Tong University. His research includes theoretical particle physics, string theory and cosmology. Yanagida works on super symmetry, inflation and the baryon asymmetry. He is a corresponding member of the Academy of Sciences and Humanities in Hamburg. In 2017 he visited the Higgs Centre of Theoretical Physics at Edinburgh University as a guest scientist.

== Honours ==
- 2020: The Particle Physics Medal (Physical Society of Japan)
- 2014: Helmholtz International Fellow Award
- 2012: Youji Totsuka Prize
- 2011: Hertz Lecture at DESY Hamburg
- 2003: Alexander von Humboldt Prize
- 1992: Nishina Memorial Prize
- 1989: Yukawa Memorial Prize

== Publications (selection) ==
- Yanagida, T. (1979-02-14). "Horizontal Gauge Symmetry and Masses of Neutrinos (KEK, Conf. Proc. C7902131)". Progress of Theoretical Physics. 64 (3). Oxford University Press (OUP): 1103–1105. doi:10.1143/ptp.64.1103. ISSN 0033-068X.
- Yanagida, T. (1979-12-01). "Horizontal symmetry and mass of the t quark". Phys. Rev. D. 20 (11). American Physical Society: 2986–2988. doi:10.1103/PhysRevD.20.2986.
- Yanagida, T.; Yoshimura, M. (1980-11-01). "Various Schemes of Neutrino Mixing". Progress of Theoretical Physics. 64 (5). Oxford University Press (OUP): 1870–1873. doi:10.1143/ptp.64.1870. ISSN 0033-068X.
- Fukugita, M.; Yanagida, T. (1986). "Barygenesis without grand unification". Physics Letters B. 174 (1). Elsevier BV: 45–47. doi:10.1016/0370-2693(86)91126-3. ISSN 0370-2693.
- Buchmüller, W.; Peccei, R.D.; Yanagida, T. (2005). "Leptogenesis as the origin of matter". Annual Review of Nuclear and Particle Science. 55 (1). Annual Reviews: 311–355. arXiv:hep-ph/0502169. doi:10.1146/annurev.nucl.55.090704.151558. ISSN 0163-8998.

== Books ==
- Masataka Fukugita, Tsutomu Yanagida: Physics of Neutrinos and Application to Astrophysics, Springer, 2003
