= Hayward metric =

Non-singular black hole metric

The Hayward metric is the simplest description of a black hole which is non-singular. The metric was written down by Sean Hayward as the minimal model which is regular, static, spherically symmetric and asymptotically flat.

It is given by

$$d s^2 = dr^2 /F(r) - F(r)dt^2 + r^2dS^2,$$

where $dS^2$ is the metric on the two-sphere, and

$$F(r) = 1 - \frac{2mr^2}{r^3+2l^2m},$$

where $m$ is the mass and $l$ a positive constant that determines the length scale.

The metric is not derived from any particular alternative theory of gravity, but provides a framework to test the formation and evaporation of non-singular black holes both within general relativity and beyond. Hayward first published his metric in 2005 and numerous papers have studied it since.
