= Einstein–Cartan theory =

Classical theory of gravitation

In theoretical physics, the Einstein–Cartan theory, also known as the Einstein–Cartan–Sciama–Kibble theory, is a classical theory of gravitation, one of several alternatives to general relativity. The theory was first proposed by Élie Cartan in 1922.

== Overview ==
Einstein–Cartan theory differs from general relativity in two ways:

1. it is formulated within the framework of Riemann–Cartan geometry, which possesses a locally gauged Lorentz symmetry, while general relativity is formulated within the framework of Riemannian geometry, which does not;
2. an additional set of equations are posed that relate torsion to spin.

This difference can be factored into

general relativity (Einstein–Hilbert) → general relativity (Palatini) → Einstein–Cartan

by first reformulating general relativity onto a Riemann–Cartan geometry, replacing the Einstein–Hilbert action over Riemannian geometry by the Palatini action (see also Palatini variation) over Riemann–Cartan geometry; and second, removing the zero torsion constraint from the Palatini action, which results in the additional set of equations for spin and torsion, as well as the addition of extra spin-related terms in the Einstein field equations themselves.

The theory of general relativity was originally formulated in the setting of Riemannian geometry by the Einstein–Hilbert action, out of which arise the Einstein field equations. At the time of its original formulation, there was no concept of Riemann–Cartan geometry. Nor was there a sufficient awareness of the concept of gauge symmetry to understand that Riemannian geometries do not possess the requisite structure to embody a locally gauged Lorentz symmetry, such as would be required to be able to express continuity equations and conservation laws for rotational and boost symmetries, or to describe spinors in curved spacetime geometries. The result of adding this infrastructure is a Riemann–Cartan geometry. In particular, to be able to describe spinors requires the inclusion of a spin structure, which suffices to produce such a geometry.

The chief difference between a Riemann–Cartan geometry and Riemannian geometry is that in the former, the affine connection is independent of the metric, while in the latter it is derived from the metric as the Levi-Civita connection, the difference between the two being referred to as the contorsion. In particular, the antisymmetric part of the connection (referred to as the torsion) is zero for Levi-Civita connections, as one of the defining conditions for such connections.

Because the contorsion can be expressed linearly in terms of the torsion, it is also possible to directly translate the Einstein–Hilbert action into a Riemann–Cartan geometry, the result being the Palatini action. It is derived by rewriting the Einstein–Hilbert action in terms of the affine connection and then separately posing a constraint that forces both the torsion and contorsion to be zero, which thus forces the affine connection to be equal to the Levi-Civita connection. Because it is a direct translation of the action and field equations of general relativity, expressed in terms of the Levi-Civita connection, this may be regarded as the theory of general relativity, itself, transposed into the framework of Riemann–Cartan geometry.

Einstein–Cartan theory relaxes this condition and, correspondingly, relaxes general relativity's assumption that the affine connection have a vanishing antisymmetric part (torsion tensor). The action used is the same as the Palatini action, except that the constraint on the torsion is removed. This results in two differences from general relativity:

(1) the field equations are now expressed in terms of affine connection, rather than the Levi-Civita connection, and so have additional terms in Einstein's field equations involving the contorsion that are not present in the field equations derived from the Palatini formulation;

(2) an additional set of equations are now present which couple the torsion to the intrinsic angular momentum (spin) of matter, much in the same way in which the affine connection is coupled to the energy and momentum of matter.

In Einstein–Cartan theory, the torsion is now a variable in the principle of stationary action that is coupled to a curved spacetime formulation of spin (the spin tensor). These extra equations express the torsion linearly in terms of the spin tensor associated with the matter source, which entails that the torsion generally be non-zero inside matter.

A consequence of the linearity is that outside of matter there is zero torsion, so that the exterior geometry remains the same as what would be described in general relativity. The differences between Einstein–Cartan theory and general relativity (formulated either in terms of the Einstein–Hilbert action on Riemannian geometry or the Palatini action on Riemann–Cartan geometry) rest solely on what happens to the geometry inside matter sources. That is: "torsion does not propagate". Generalizations of the Einstein–Cartan action have been considered which allow for propagating torsion.

Because Riemann–Cartan geometries have Lorentz symmetry as a local gauge symmetry, it is possible to formulate the associated conservation laws. In particular, regarding the metric and torsion tensors as independent variables gives the correct generalization of the conservation law for the total (orbital plus intrinsic) angular momentum to the presence of the gravitational field.

== History ==
The theory was first proposed by Élie Cartan, who was inspired by Cosserat elasticity theory, in 1922 and expounded in the following few years. Albert Einstein became affiliated with the theory in 1928 during his unsuccessful attempt to match torsion to the electromagnetic field tensor as part of a unified field theory. This line of thought led him to the related but different theory of teleparallelism.

Dennis Sciama and Tom Kibble independently revisited the theory in the 1960s.

Einstein–Cartan theory has been historically overshadowed by its torsion-free counterpart and other alternatives like Brans–Dicke theory because torsion seemed to add little predictive benefit at the expense of the tractability of its equations. Since the Einstein–Cartan theory is purely classical, it also does not fully address the issue of quantum gravity.

In the Einstein–Cartan theory, the Dirac equation becomes nonlinear when it is expressed in terms of the Levi-Civita connection, though it remains linear when expressed in terms of the connection native to the geometry. Because the torsion does not 'propagate', its relation to the spin tensor of the matter source is algebraic and it is possible to solve in terms of the spin tensor. In turn, the difference between the connection and Levi-Civita connection (the contorsion) can be solved in terms of the torsion. When the contorsion is back-substituted for in the Dirac equation, to reduce the connection to the Levi-Civita connection (e.g. in passing from equation (4.1) to equation (4.2) in), this results in non-linear contributions arising, ultimately, from the Dirac field itself. If two or more Dirac fields are present, or other fields that carry spin, the non-linear additions to the Dirac equation of each field would include contributions from all of the other fields, as well.

Even though renowned physicists such as Steven Weinberg "never understood what is so important physically about the possibility of torsion in differential geometry", other physicists claim that theories with torsion are valuable.

== Field equations ==
The Einstein field equations of general relativity can be derived by postulating the Einstein–Hilbert action to be the true action of spacetime and then varying that action with respect to the metric tensor. The field equations of Einstein–Cartan theory come from exactly the same approach, except that a general asymmetric affine connection is assumed rather than the symmetric Levi-Civita connection (i.e., spacetime is assumed to have torsion in addition to curvature), and then the metric and torsion are varied independently.

Let $\mathcal{L}_\mathrm{M}$ represent the Lagrangian density of matter and $\mathcal{L}_\mathrm{G}$ represent the Lagrangian density of the gravitational field. The Lagrangian density for the gravitational field in the Einstein–Cartan theory is proportional to the Ricci scalar:

$$\mathcal{L}_\mathrm{G}=\frac{1}{2\kappa}R \sqrt{|g|}$$
$$S=\int \left( \mathcal{L}_\mathrm{G} + \mathcal{L}_\mathrm{M} \right) \, d^4x ,$$

where $g$ is the determinant of the metric tensor, and $\kappa$ is a physical constant $8\pi G/c^4$ involving the gravitational constant and the speed of light. By Hamilton's principle, the variation of the total action $S$ for the gravitational field and matter vanishes:

$$\delta S = 0.$$

The variation with respect to the metric tensor $g^{ab}$ yields the Einstein equations:

$$\frac{\delta \mathcal{L}_\mathrm{G}}{\delta g^{ab}} -\frac{1}{2}P_{ab}=0$$

$R_{ab}-\frac{1}{2}R g_{ab}=\kappa P_{ab}$

where $R_{ab}$ is the Ricci tensor and $P_{ab}$ is the canonical stress–energy–momentum tensor. The Ricci tensor is no longer symmetric because the connection contains a nonzero torsion tensor; therefore, the right-hand side of the equation cannot be symmetric either, implying that $P_{ab}$ must include an asymmetric contribution that can be shown to be related to the spin tensor. This canonical energy–momentum tensor is related to the more familiar symmetric energy–momentum tensor by the Belinfante–Rosenfeld procedure.

The variation with respect to the torsion tensor ${T^{ab}}_c$ yields the Cartan spin connection equations

$$\frac{\delta \mathcal{L}_\mathrm{G}}{\delta {T^{ab}}_c} -\frac{1}{2}{\sigma_{ab}}^c =0$$

${T_{ab}}^c + {g_a}^c{T_{bd}}^d - {g_b}^c {T_{ad}}^d = \kappa {\sigma_{ab}}^c$

where ${\sigma_{ab}}^c$ is the spin tensor. Because the torsion equation is an algebraic constraint rather than a partial differential equation, the torsion field does not propagate as a wave, and vanishes outside of matter. Therefore, in principle the torsion can be algebraically eliminated from the theory in favor of the spin tensor, which generates an effective "spin–spin" nonlinear self-interaction inside matter. Torsion is equal to its source term and can be replaced by a boundary or a topological structure with a throat such as a "wormhole".

== Avoidance of singularities ==
Recently, interest in Einstein–Cartan theory has been driven toward nonsingular black hole models and cosmological implications, most importantly, the avoidance of a gravitational singularity at the beginning of the universe, such as in the black hole cosmology, quantum cosmology, oscillating universe, cyclic model, and the wave-collision model.

Singularity theorems which are premised on and formulated within the setting of Riemannian geometry (e.g. Penrose–Hawking singularity theorems) need not hold in Riemann–Cartan geometry. Consequently, Einstein–Cartan theory is able to avoid the general-relativistic problem of the singularity at the Big Bang. The minimal coupling between torsion and Dirac spinors generates an effective nonlinear spin–spin self-interaction, which becomes significant inside fermionic matter at extremely high densities. Such an interaction is conjectured to replace the singular Big Bang with a cusp-like Big Bounce at a minimum but finite scale factor, before which the observable universe was contracting. This scenario also explains why the present Universe at largest scales appears spatially flat, homogeneous and isotropic, providing a physical alternative to cosmic inflation. Torsion allows fermions to be spatially extended instead of "pointlike", which helps to avoid the formation of singularities such as black holes, removes the ultraviolet divergence in quantum field theory, and leads to the toroidal ring model of electrons. According to general relativity, the gravitational collapse of a sufficiently compact mass forms a singular black hole. In the Einstein–Cartan theory, instead, the collapse reaches a bounce and forms a regular Einstein–Rosen bridge (wormhole) to a new, growing universe on the other side of the event horizon; pair production by the gravitational field after the bounce, when torsion is still strong, generates a finite period of inflation.

== Other ==
Einstein–Cartan theory seems to allow gravitational shielding and the oscillation of massless neutrinos without violating the equivalence principle.

In addition, the Einstein–Cartan theory is also related to geometrodynamics and the vortex theory of the atom.

== See also ==
- Alternatives to general relativity
- Metric-affine gravitation theory
- Gauge theory gravity
- Loop quantum gravity
