= Valeri Frolov (physicist) =

Canadian theoretical physicist, author of books on Black Hole physics

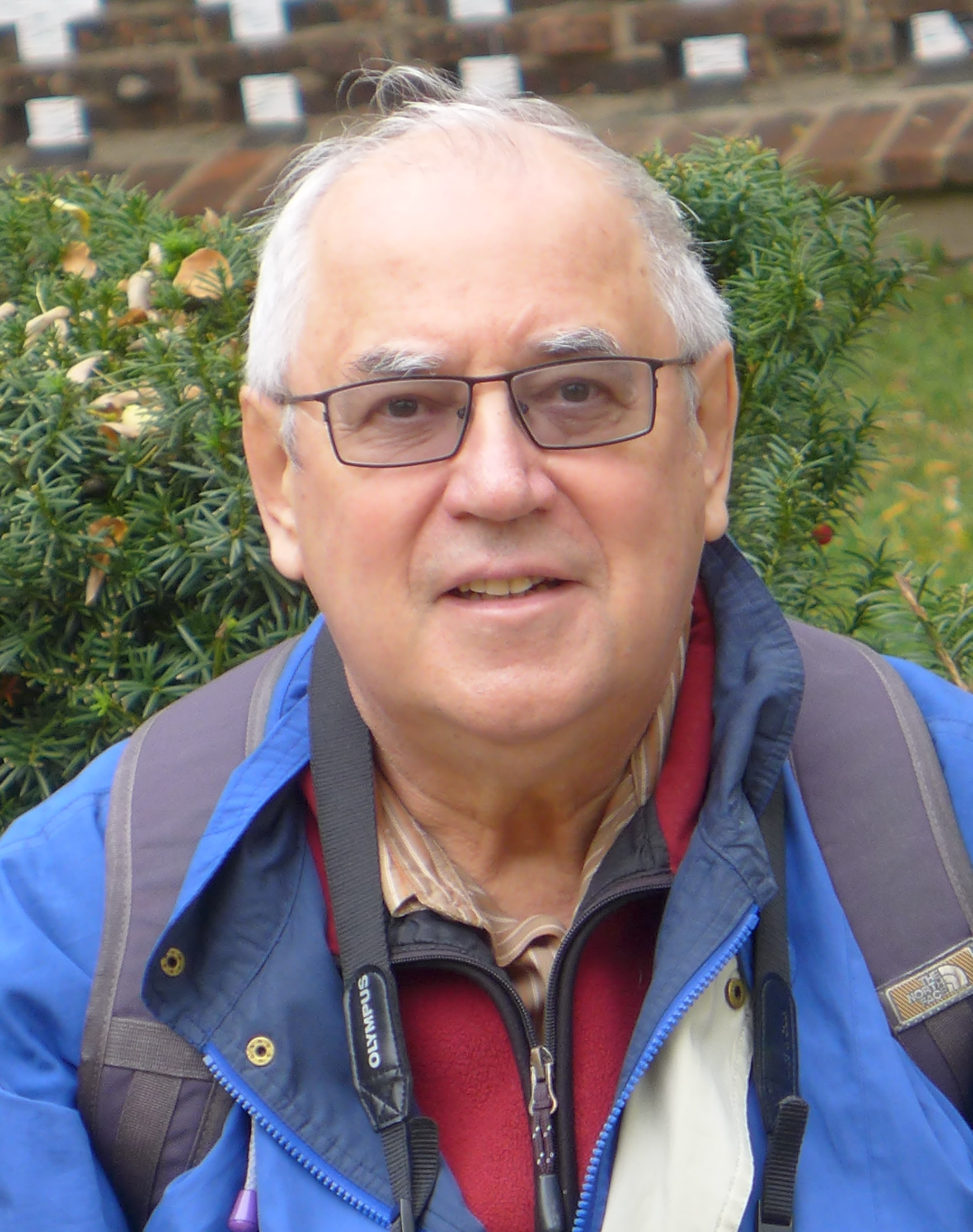
Valeri Frolov

Valeri Frolov (born October 7, 1946) is a Russian-born Canadian theoretical physicist at the University of Alberta, Canada. His research is concerned with black hole physics and quantum gravity.

== Background and Education ==
Valeri Frolov was born and grew up in Moscow. He graduated from the Moscow State University and obtained his Master's Degree in 1970. Later, he received his Candidate of Sciences degree in 1973 and his Doctor of Sciences degree in 1980, both in theoretical physics from P.N. Lebedev Physical Institute, Moscow.

== Work ==
Frolov's professional scientific career began in 1970, when he jointed the P.N. Lebedev Physical Institute. He worked there as an assistant professor, an associate professor, and, from 1980 to 1992, as a full professor. Concurrently, he was also a professor from 1985 to 1992 at the Moscow Institute of Physics and Technology. In 1992 he spent one year as a visiting professor at the University of Copenhagen. In 1993 he moved to Edmonton, Canada, where he became a full professor at the University of Alberta and received the Killam Memorial Chair, a position which he holds today.

== Research ==
Early in his career, Frolov studied white holes and semi-closed worlds. In 1970, he and his supervisor, M.A. Markov, published a paper which discussed quantum particle creation by charged black holes. In 1980, he and Gregory Vilkovisky proposed a model of a regular evaporating black hole and presented a conformal diagram of its spacetime. Later, his main interest focused on quantum effects in black holes. In 1987, he and Vitaly Ginzburg published a paper on the equivalence principle in the quantum domain. In 1989, he published with Kip Thorne a paper discussing quantum effects near the horizon of a rotating black hole and proposed a state of the vacuum, which is sometimes referred to as the Frolov-Thorne vacuum. In 1994 he (with A. Barvinsky and A. Zelnikov) introduced a no-boundary wave function of a black hole, and in 1996 he with (D. Fursaev and A. Zelnikov) proposed an explanation of the black hole entropy based on Sakharov's ideas of induced gravity. During the same period of time, he also studied cosmic strings, their interaction with black holes, and quantum effects in the string background; wormholes and "time machines;" and regular black hole models. From 2006 to 2018 the main focus of his research was on the hidden symmetries of black holes of dimension four and higher. In collaboration with D. Kubizňák and P. Krtouš, he demonstrated that all these solutions of the Einstein equations possessed a special geometrical object, called the Killing-Yano tensor, which is responsible for a complete integrability of the equations of motion of particles and a separability of most interesting physical field equations in these spacetimes. More recently, he proposed an effective action for electromagnetic and gravitational spin-optics, which is a generalization of the standard geometric optics and which takes into account the interaction of the spin of these fields with the spacetime curvature.

== Awards and honors ==
- Killam Memorial Chair (1993 to present)
- Markov Prize of the Institute for Nuclear Research of the Russian Academy of Sciences for outstanding contributions to black hole theory (2016)

== Books ==
- Igor D. Novikov and Valeri P. Frolov, "Black Hole Physics" (Fundamental Theories of Physics, Volume 27, 341 pages, 1989. This is an English translation of the book in Russian, published in 1986 by Nauka Publ.
- Valeri P. Frolov and Igor D. Novikov, "Black Hole Physics: Basic Concepts and New Developments", Fundamental Theories of Physics, Volume 96, 770 pages, 1998
- Valeri P. Frolov and Andrei Zelnikov, "Introduction to Black Hole Physics", Oxford University Press, 488 pages, 2011

== Book chapter ==
- Frolov, V. P. The Newman-Penrose Method in the Theory of General Relativity. A chapter in: Basov, N.G. (eds) Problems in the General Theory of Relativity and Theory of Group Representations. The Lebedev Physics Institute Series. Springer, Boston, MA., pages 73–185, 1979
