= Yasunori Nomura =

Japanese theoretical physicist

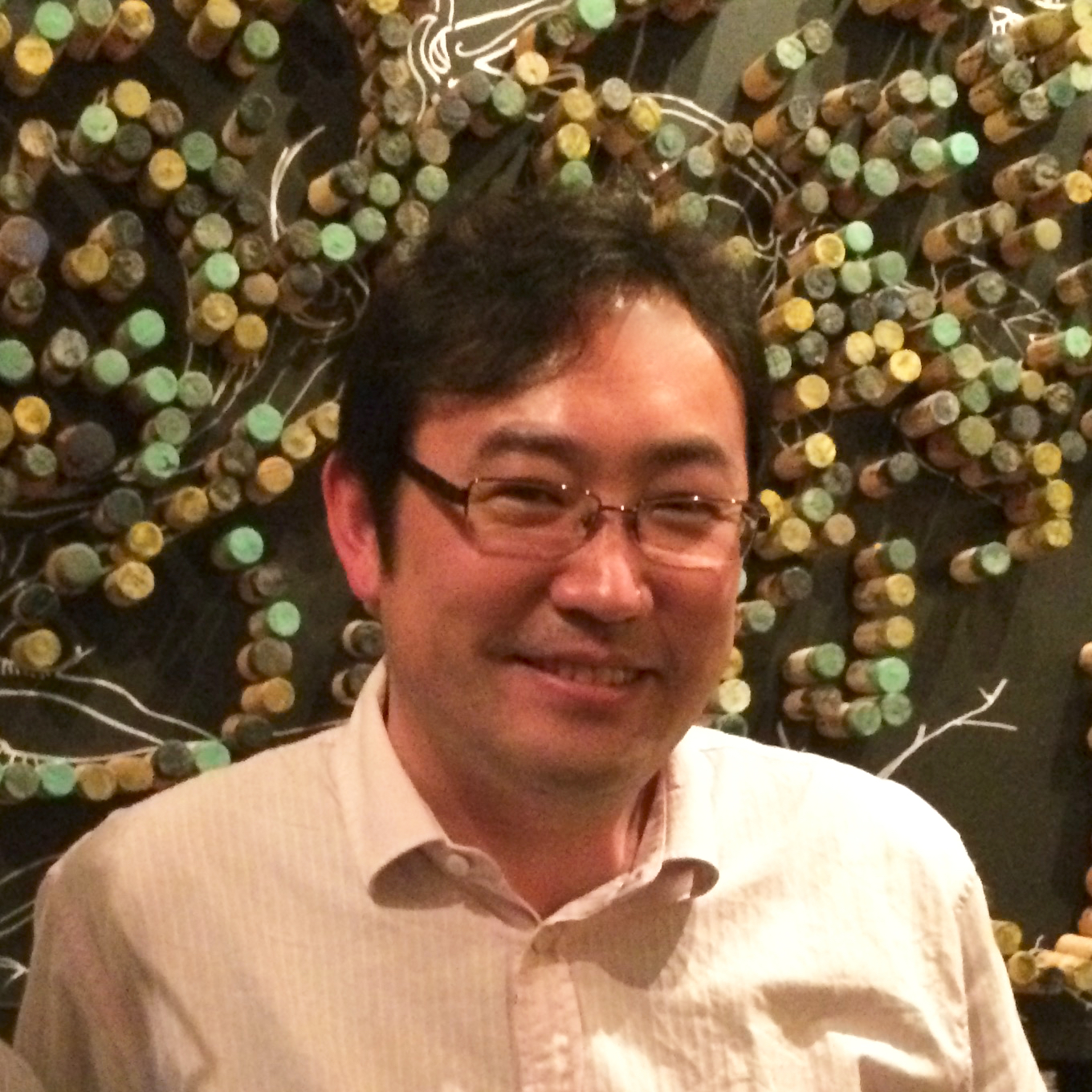
- Berkeley physicist Yasunori Nomura, January 7, 2016
- Born: January 21, 1974 (age 52); Kanagawa, Japan
- Education: University of Tokyo
- Known for: Orbifold GUTs; Holographic Higgs; Multiverse is the same as quantum many worlds
- Scientific career
- Workplaces: University of California, Berkeley

Yasunori Nomura (born 21 January 1974 - ) is a theoretical physicist working on particle physics, quantum gravity, and cosmology. He is a professor of physics at University of California, Berkeley, a senior faculty scientist at Lawrence Berkeley National Laboratory, a senior research scientist at Riken, and an affiliate member at Kavli Institute for the Physics and Mathematics of the Universe. Since 2015, he has been the director of the Berkeley Center for Theoretical Physics.

== Career ==
Nomura received his Ph.D. from University of Tokyo (supervisor Tsutomu Yanagida) in 2000 and became a Miller Research Fellow at University of California, Berkeley. In 2002-03 he was an associate scientist at Fermi National Accelerator Laboratory. In July 2003 he joined the Department of Physics at University of California, Berkeley. In 2017, Nomura was elected a Fellow of the American Physical Society "for pioneering contributions to a variety of areas of particle theory, including gauge unification in extra dimensions, electroweak symmetry breaking, supersymmetric models, dark matter, the multiverse, foundations of quantum mechanics, and black holes."

== Work ==
Nomura works on particle physics, quantum gravity, and cosmology. He developed theories of grand unification in higher dimensional spacetime and constructed the so-called holographic Higgs model, the first realistic model in which a composite Higgs particle arises as a pseudo-Nambu–Goldstone boson. He also proposed that the eternally inflating multiverse is the same thing as quantum many worlds.
