= Valeri Frolov (footballer, born 1970) =

Russian footballer

Personal information
- Full name: Valeri Vladimirovich Frolov
- Date of birth: 13 March 1970 (age 56)
- Height: 1.76 m (5 ft 9 1/2 in)
- Positions: Forward; midfielder

Youth career
- EShVSM Moscow

Senior career*
Years	Team	Apps	(Gls)
1987	EShVSM Moscow	1	(1)
1987–1988	FC Dynamo Moscow	0	(0)
1989–1991	FC Spartak Kostroma	34	(3)
1991	FC Znamya Arzamas	20	(0)
1991–1993	FC Lokomotiv Nizhny Novgorod	26	(1)
1993	FC Gornyak	18	(4)
1994	FC Lokomotiv Nizhny Novgorod	7	(0)
1995	FC Khimik Dzerzhinsk	14	(5)
1995	FC Aktyubinets	8	(1)
1996–1999	FC Energetik Uren	97	(13)
1999	FC Torpedo Arzamas	16	(0)
2000	FC Torpedo Pavlovo	17	(3)
2001	FC Torpedo-Viktoriya Nizhny Novgorod	5	(0)
2001	FC Don Novomoskovsk	14	(0)
2002	FC Lokomotiv-NN Nizhny Novgorod (amateur)		
2002	FC Dynamo-GAI Nizhny Novgorod		
- * Club domestic league appearances and goals

Valeri Vladimirovich Frolov (Russian: Валерий Владимирович Фролов; born 13 March 1970) is a former Russian football player.

== Honours ==
Gornyak

- Kazakhstan Premier League bronze: 1993
