= Spin tensor =

Spinning motion in theoretical physics

In mathematics, mathematical physics, and theoretical physics, the spin tensor is a quantity used to describe the rotational motion of particles in spacetime. The spin tensor has application in general relativity and special relativity, as well as quantum mechanics, relativistic quantum mechanics, and quantum field theory.

The special Euclidean group SE(d) of direct isometries is generated by translations and rotations. Its Lie algebra is written $\mathfrak{se}(d)$.

This article uses Cartesian coordinates and tensor index notation.

== Background on Noether currents ==
The Noether current for translations in space is momentum, while the current for increments in time is energy. These two statements combine into one in spacetime: translations in spacetime, i.e. a displacement between two events, is generated by the four-momentum P. Conservation of four-momentum is given by the continuity equation:

$$\partial_\nu T^{\mu\nu} = 0\,,$$

where $T^{\mu\nu} \,$ is the stress–energy tensor, and ∂ are partial derivatives that make up the four-gradient (in non-Cartesian coordinates this must be replaced by the covariant derivative). Integrating over space:

$$\int d^3 x T^{\mu 0}\left(\vec{x}, t\right) = P^\mu$$

gives the four-momentum vector at time t.

The Noether current for a rotation about the point y is given by a tensor of 3rd order, denoted $M^{\alpha\beta\mu}_y$. Because of the Lie algebra relations

$$M^{\alpha\beta\mu}_y(x) = M^{\alpha\beta\mu}_0(x) + y^\alpha T^{\beta\mu}(x) - y^\beta T^{\alpha\mu}(x)\,,$$

where the 0 subscript indicates the origin (unlike momentum, angular momentum depends on the origin), the integral:

$$\int d^3 x M^{\mu\nu}_0(\vec{x},t)$$

gives the angular momentum tensor $M^{\mu\nu} \,$ at time t.

== Definition ==
The spin tensor is defined at a point x to be the value of the Noether current at x of a rotation about x,

$$S^{\alpha\beta\mu}(\mathbf{x}) \mathrel\stackrel{\mathrm{def}}{=} M^{\alpha\beta\mu}_x(\mathbf{x}) = M^{\alpha\beta\mu}_0(\mathbf{x}) + x^\alpha T^{\beta\mu}(\mathbf{x}) - x^\beta T^{\alpha\mu}(\mathbf{x})$$

The continuity equation

$$\partial_\mu M^{\alpha\beta\mu}_0=0\,,$$

implies:

$$\partial_\mu S^{\alpha\beta\mu} = T^{\beta\alpha} - T^{\alpha\beta} \neq 0$$

and therefore, the stress–energy tensor is not a symmetric tensor.

The quantity S is the density of spin angular momentum (spin in this case is not only for a point-like particle, but also for an extended body), and M is the density of orbital angular momentum. The total angular momentum is always the sum of spin and orbital contributions.

The relation:

$$T_{ij} - T_{ji}$$

gives the torque density showing the rate of conversion between the orbital angular momentum and spin.

== Examples ==
Examples of materials with a nonzero spin density are molecular fluids, the electromagnetic field and turbulent fluids. For molecular fluids, the individual molecules may be spinning. The electromagnetic field can have circularly polarized light. For turbulent fluids, we may arbitrarily make a distinction between long wavelength phenomena and short wavelength phenomena. A long wavelength vorticity may be converted via turbulence into tinier and tinier vortices transporting the angular momentum into smaller and smaller wavelengths while simultaneously reducing the vorticity. This can be approximated by the eddy viscosity.

== See also ==
- Belinfante–Rosenfeld stress–energy tensor
- Poincaré group
- Lorentz group
- Relativistic angular momentum
- Mathisson–Papapetrou–Dixon equations
- Pauli–Lubanski pseudovector
