= Blake Temple =

American applied mathematician

- Born: 1951 (age 74–75)
- Education: University of Michigan
- Known for: Shock waves in general relativity Shock-wave cosmology Systems of conservation laws
- Awards: Guggenheim Fellowship
- Scientific career
- Fields: Applied mathematics, partial differential equations, general relativity, numerical analysis
- Workplaces: Rockefeller University; Courant Institute of Mathematical Sciences; University of Wisconsin-Madison; University of California, Davis
- Website: www.math.ucdavis.edu/~temple/

John Blake Temple (born 1951) is an American applied mathematician and Distinguished Professor Emeritus of mathematics at the University of California, Davis. His research concerns shock waves, general relativity, partial differential equations, numerical analysis, and systems of conservation laws.

== Life and career ==
Temple was born in Cleveland, Ohio in 1951, and grew up in Solon, Ohio the moved to Ann Arbor in 1967 at the age of 16 and graduated from Ann Arbor High School in 1969.

Temple entered the University of Michigan in 1969 initially studying philosophy, however his philosophy advisor encouraged him to try calculus and in which he particularly enjoyed learning about the proofs. Temple received a B.A. in philosophy from the University of Michigan in 1973, then an M.S. in mathematics and education from Michigan in 1976, and a Ph.D. in mathematics from Michigan in 1980. It is during his years as a PH.D. student he has met an impactful figure of his life; his doctoral advisor Joel Smoller who later became a life long friend and a teacher whom Temple was most beholden to.

After completing his doctorate, he was a National Science Foundation postdoctoral fellow at Rockefeller University from 1980 to 1982, a visiting member of the Courant Institute of Mathematical Sciences from 1982 to 1983, and a research fellow and Van Vleck Assistant Professor at the University of Wisconsin-Madison. He joined the University of California, Davis in 1986, became professor in 1990, and was named Distinguished Professor of Mathematics in 2012.

Temple was chair of the UC Davis Graduate Group in Applied Mathematics from 1988 to 1990 and from 2004 to 2007. He was a visiting scholar at the Institut des Hautes Etudes Scientifiques in 2002, the Isaac Newton Institute in 2003, and a Gehring Professor of Mathematics at the University of Michigan in 2008.

== Research ==
Temple's research is centered on the mathematical theory of shock waves and their role in nonlinear partial differential equations and general relativity. His early work included systems of conservation laws, invariant submanifolds, the water-hammer problem, and stability questions for numerical methods such as Godunov's method.

With collaborators, Temple developed a theory of shock-wave propagation in the Einstein equations of general relativity. With Joel Smoller, he constructed shock-wave cosmological models, including models in which an expanding Friedmann universe is matched to a Schwarzschild spacetime by a shock wave. Temple and Smoller also studied expanding wave solutions of the Einstein equations that introduce corrections to the standard cosmological redshift-luminosity relation.

Temple has also worked with Robin Young on time-periodic solutions of the compressible Euler equations and nonlinear sound-wave propagation, and with Moritz Reintjes on regularity transformation equations for smoothing gravitational metrics in general relativity.

In 1990, Temple published From Newton to Einstein in the American Mathematical Monthly, presenting Einstein's derivation of the perihelion shift in Mercury's orbit at a level accessible to advanced undergraduate mathematics students.

== Awards and honors ==
- National Science Foundation Postdoctoral Fellowship, 1980-1982
- Guggenheim Fellowship, 1994-1995
- Gehring Professor of Mathematics, University of Michigan, 2008
- Distinguished Visiting Professor, Taiwan and Hong Kong, 2009
- Distinguished Professor of Mathematics, University of California, Davis, 2012

== Selected publications ==
- Luskin, Mitchell; Temple, Blake (1982). "The existence of a global weak solution of the waterhammer problem". Communications on Pure and Applied Mathematics. 35: 697–735.
- LeVeque, Randall J.; Temple, Blake (1985). "Stability of Godunov's method for a class of 2 x 2 systems of conservation laws". Transactions of the American Mathematical Society. 288 (1): 115–123.
- Temple, Blake (1990). "From Newton to Einstein". American Mathematical Monthly.
- Smoller, Joel; Temple, Blake (1994). "Shock-wave solutions of the Einstein equations: The Oppenheimer-Snyder model of gravitational collapse extended to the case of non-zero pressure". Archive for Rational Mechanics and Analysis. 128: 249–297.
- Groah, Jeffrey; Temple, Blake (2000). "A shock-wave formulation of the Einstein equations". Methods and Applications of Analysis. 7 (4): 793–812.
- Smoller, Joel; Temple, Blake (2003). "Shock-wave cosmology inside a black hole". Proceedings of the National Academy of Sciences. 100 (20): 11216–11218. arXiv:astro-ph/0210105.
- Smoller, Joel; Temple, Blake (2009). "A one parameter family of expanding wave solutions of the Einstein equations that induces an anomalous acceleration into the Standard Model of Cosmology". Proceedings of the National Academy of Sciences. 106 (34): 14218–14223. arXiv:0901.1639.
- Reintjes, Moritz; Temple, Blake (2023). "Optimal regularity and Uhlenbeck compactness for general relativity and Yang-Mills theory". Proceedings of the Royal Society A. arXiv:2202.09535. doi:10.1098/rspa.2022.0444. hdl:2031/0fc2cce5-6cb4-41c5-b2b8-279d28c793f1.

== Academic career ==
1980–1982: NSF Postdoctoral Fellow, Rockefeller University.

1982–1983: Visiting Member, Courant Institute of Mathematical Sciences.

1983–1986: Research Fellow, Mathematics Research Center, University of Wisconsin–Madison.

1984–1986: Van Vleck Assistant Professor, University of Wisconsin–Madison.

1986–1988: Assistant Professor, UC Davis.

1988–1990: Associate Professor, UC Davis.

1990–2012: Professor, UC Davis.

July 2012: Appointed Distinguished Professor of Mathematics.
