= White hole =

Hypothetical object of spacetime

In general relativity, a white hole is a hypothetical region of spacetime and singularity that cannot be entered from the outside, although energy, matter, light and information can escape from it. In this sense, it is the opposite of a black hole, from which energy, matter, light and information cannot escape. White holes appear in the theory of eternal black holes. In addition to a black hole region in the future, such a solution of the Einstein field equations has a white hole region in its past. This region does not exist for black holes that have formed through gravitational collapse, however, nor are there any observed physical processes through which a white hole could be formed.

Supermassive black holes (SMBHs) are theoretically predicted to be at the center of every galaxy and may be essential for their formation. Stephen Hawking and others have proposed that these supermassive black holes could spawn supermassive white holes.

== Overview ==
Like black holes, white holes have properties such as mass, charge, and angular momentum. They attract matter like any other mass, but objects falling towards a white hole would never actually reach the white hole's event horizon (though in the case of the maximally extended Schwarzschild solution, discussed below, the white hole event horizon in the past becomes a black hole event horizon in the future, so any object falling towards it will eventually reach the black hole horizon). Imagine a gravitational field, without a surface. Acceleration due to gravity is the greatest on the surface of any body. But since black holes lack a surface, acceleration due to gravity increases exponentially, but never reaches a final value as there is no considered surface in a singularity.

In quantum mechanics, the black hole emits Hawking radiation and so it can come to thermal equilibrium with a gas of radiation (not compulsory). Because a thermal-equilibrium state is time-reversal-invariant, Stephen Hawking argued that the time reversal of a black hole in thermal equilibrium results in a white hole in thermal equilibrium (each absorbing and emitting energy to equivalent degrees). Consequently, this may imply that black holes and white holes are reciprocal in structure, where in the Hawking radiation from an ordinary black hole is identified with a white hole's emission of energy and matter. Hawking's semi-classical argument is reproduced in a quantum mechanical AdS/CFT treatment, where a black hole in anti-de Sitter space is described by a thermal gas in a gauge theory, whose time reversal is the same as itself.

== History ==
A diagram of the structure of the maximally extended black hole spacetime. The horizontal direction is space and the vertical direction is time.

In the 1930s, physicists Robert Oppenheimer and Hartland Snyder introduced the idea of white holes as a solution to Einstein's equations of general relativity. These equations, the foundation of modern physics, describe the curvature of spacetime due to massive objects. Whereas black holes are born from the collapse of stars, white holes represent the theoretical birth of space, time, and potentially even universes. At the center, space and time do not end into a singularity, but continue across a short transition region where the Einstein equations are violated by quantum effects. From this region, space and time emerge with the structure of a white hole interior, a possibility already suggested by John Lighton Synge.

The possibility of the existence of white holes was put forward by cosmologist Igor Novikov in 1964, developed by Nikolai Kardashev. White holes are predicted as part of a solution to the Einstein field equations known as the maximally extended version of the Schwarzschild metric describing an eternal black hole with no charge and no rotation. Here, "maximally extended" implies that spacetime should not have any "edges". For any possible trajectory of a free-falling particle (following a geodesic) in spacetime, it should be possible to continue this path arbitrarily far into the particle's future, unless the trajectory hits a gravitational singularity like the one at the center of the black hole's interior. In order to satisfy this requirement, it turns out that in addition to the black hole interior region that particles enter when they fall through the event horizon from the outside, there must be a separate white hole interior region, which allows us to extrapolate the trajectories of particles that an outside observer sees rising up away from the event horizon. For an observer outside using Schwarzschild coordinates, infalling particles take an infinite time to reach the black hole horizon infinitely far in the future, while outgoing particles that pass the observer have been traveling outward for an infinite time since crossing the white hole horizon infinitely far in the past (however, the particles or other objects experience only a finite proper time between crossing the horizon and passing the outside observer). The black hole/white hole appears "eternal" from the perspective of an outside observer, in the sense that particles traveling outward from the white hole interior region can pass the observer at any time, and particles traveling inward, which will eventually reach the black hole interior region can also pass the observer at any time.

Just as there are two separate interior regions of the maximally extended spacetime, there are also two separate exterior regions, sometimes called two different "universes", with the second universe allowing us to extrapolate some possible particle trajectories in the two interior regions. This means that the interior black-hole region can contain a mix of particles that fell in from either universe (and thus an observer who fell in from one universe might be able to see light that fell in from the other one), and likewise particles from the interior white-hole region can escape into either universe. All four regions can be seen in a spacetime diagram that uses Kruskal–Szekeres coordinates (see figure).

In this spacetime, it is possible to come up with coordinate systems such that if one picks a hypersurface of constant time (a set of points that all have the same time coordinate, such that every point on the surface has a space-like separation, giving what is called a 'space-like surface') and draw an "embedding diagram" depicting the curvature of space at that time, the embedding diagram will look like a tube connecting the two exterior regions, known as an "Einstein-Rosen bridge" or Schwarzschild wormhole. Depending on where the space-like hypersurface is chosen, the Einstein-Rosen bridge can either connect two black hole event horizons in each universe (with points in the interior of the bridge being part of the black hole region of the spacetime), or two white hole event horizons in each universe (with points in the interior of the bridge being part of the white hole region). It is impossible to use the bridge to cross from one universe to the other, however, because it is impossible to enter a white hole event horizon from the outside, and anyone entering a black hole horizon from either universe will inevitably hit the black hole singularity.

The maximally extended Schwarzschild metric describes an idealized black hole/white hole that exists eternally from the perspective of external observers; a more realistic black hole that forms at some particular time from a collapsing star would require a different metric. When the infalling stellar matter is added to a diagram of a black hole's history, it removes the part of the diagram corresponding to the white hole interior region. But because the equations of general relativity are time-reversible – they exhibit Time reversal symmetry – general relativity must also allow the time-reverse of this type of "realistic" black hole that forms from collapsing matter. The time-reversed case would be a white hole that has existed since the beginning of the universe, and that emits matter until it finally "explodes" and disappears. Despite the fact that such objects are permitted theoretically, they are not taken as seriously as black holes by physicists, since there would be no processes that would naturally lead to their formation; they could exist only if they were built into the initial conditions of the Big Bang. Additionally, it is predicted that such a white hole would be highly "unstable" in the sense that if any small amount of matter fell towards the horizon from the outside, this would prevent the white hole's explosion as seen by distant observers, with the matter emitted from the singularity never able to escape the white hole's gravitational radius.

== Properties ==
Depending on the type of black hole solution considered, there are several types of white holes. In the case of the Schwarzschild black hole mentioned above, a geodesic coming out of a white hole comes from the "gravitational singularity" it contains. In the case of a black hole possessing an electric charge (Reissner-Nordström black hole) or an angular momentum (Kerr black hole), then the white hole happens to be the "exit door" of a black hole existing in another universe. Such a black hole – white hole configuration is called a wormhole. In both cases, however, it is not possible to reach the region "in" the white hole, so the behavior of it – and, in particular, what may come out of it – is completely impossible to predict. In this sense, a white hole is a configuration according to which the evolution of the universe cannot be predicted, because it is not deterministic. A "bare singularity" is another example of a non-deterministic configuration, but does not have the status of a white hole, however, because there is no region inaccessible from a given region. In its basic conception, the Big Bang can be seen as a naked singularity in outer space, but does not correspond to a white hole.

== Physical relevance ==
In its mode of formation, a black hole comes from a residue of a massive star whose core contracts until it turns into a black hole. Such a configuration is not static: it starts with a massive and extended body which contracts to give a black hole. The black hole therefore does not exist for all eternity, and there is no corresponding white hole.

To be able to exist, a white hole must either arise from a physical process leading to its formation, or be present from the creation of the universe. None of these solutions appear satisfactory: there is no known astrophysical process that can lead to the formation of such a configuration, and imposing it from the creation of the universe amounts to assuming a very specific set of initial conditions which has no concrete motivation.

In view of the enormous quantities radiated by quasars, whose luminosity makes it possible to observe them from several billion light-years away, it had been assumed that they were the seat of exotic physical phenomena such as a white hole, or a phenomenon of continuous creation of matter (see the article on the steady state theory). These ideas are now abandoned, the observed properties of quasars being very well explained by those of an accretion disk in the center of which is a supermassive black hole.

== Big Bang/Supermassive white hole ==
A view of black holes first proposed in the late 1980s might be interpreted as shedding some light on the nature of classical white holes. Some researchers have proposed that when a black hole forms, a Big Bang may occur at the core/singularity, which would create a new universe that expands outside of the parent universe.

The Einstein–Cartan–Sciama–Kibble theory of gravity extends general relativity by removing a constraint of the symmetry of the affine connection and regarding its antisymmetric part, the torsion tensor, as a dynamical variable. Torsion naturally accounts for the quantum-mechanical, intrinsic angular momentum (spin) of matter. According to general relativity, the gravitational collapse of a sufficiently compact mass forms a singular black hole. In the Einstein–Cartan theory, however, the minimal coupling between torsion and Dirac spinors generates a repulsive spin–spin interaction that is significant in fermionic matter at extremely high densities. Such an interaction prevents the formation of a gravitational singularity. Instead, the collapsing matter on the other side of the event horizon reaches an enormous but finite density and rebounds, forming a regular Einstein–Rosen bridge. The other side of the bridge becomes a new, growing baby universe. For observers in the baby universe, the parent universe appears as the only white hole. Accordingly, the observable universe is the Einstein–Rosen interior of a black hole existing as one of possibly many inside a larger universe. The Big Bang was a nonsingular Big Bounce at which the observable universe had a finite, minimum scale factor.

Shockwave cosmology, proposed by Joel Smoller and Blake Temple in 2003, has the "big bang" as an explosion inside a black hole, producing the expanding volume of space and matter that includes the observable universe. This black hole eventually becomes a white hole as the matter density reduces with the expansion. A related theory gives an alternative to dark energy.

A 2012 paper argues that the Big Bang itself is a white hole. It further suggests that the emergence of a white hole, which was named a "Small Bang", is spontaneous—all the matter is ejected at a single pulse. Thus, unlike black holes, white holes cannot be continuously observed; rather, their effects can be detected only around the event itself. The paper even proposed identifying a new group of gamma-ray bursts with white holes.

=== Various hypotheses ===
Unlike black holes for which there is a well-studied physical process (i.e. gravitational collapse, which gives rise to black holes when a star somewhat more massive than the sun exhausts its nuclear "fuel"), there is no clear analogous process that leads reliably to the production of white holes. Some hypotheses have been put forward:

- White holes as a kind of "exit" from black holes, both types of singularities would probably be connected by a wormhole; when quasars were discovered it was assumed that these were the sought-after white holes but this assumption has now been discarded.
- Another widespread idea is that white holes would be very unstable, would last a very short time and even after forming could collapse and become black holes.
- Astronomers Alon Retter and Shlomo Heller suggest that the GRB 060614 anomalous gamma-ray burst that occurred in 2006 was a "white hole".
- In 2014, the idea of the Big Bang being produced by a supermassive white hole explosion was explored in the framework of a five-dimensional vacuum by Madriz Aguilar, Moreno and Bellini.
- Finally, it has been postulated that white holes could be the temporal inverse of a black hole.

At present, very few scientists believe in the existence of white holes and it is considered only a mathematical exercise with no real-world counterpart.

== In popular culture ==
- A white hole appears in the Red Dwarf episode of the same name, where the protagonists must find a way to deal with its temporal effects on local spacetime.
- A white hole serves as a major source of conflict in the Yu-Gi-Oh! GX anime, as the radiance it exudes is both sentient and evil, known as the Light of Destruction. The Yu-Gi-Oh! card game also has a card named "White Hole", used specifically to counter the card "Dark Hole".
- A white hole serves as a very important location in the video game Outer Wilds. In this game, falling into the black hole in the center of the planet Brittle Hollow leads to this white hole.
- A white hole appears in the animated television series Voltron: Legendary Defender.
- A white hole appears as a central plot point in the Season 10 finale of the animated television series Futurama, with the episode itself being titled "The White Hole".
- A white hole is shown colliding with a black hole in a promotional video of the game Honkai: Star Rail.
- A sentient white hole named Fred is one of the main characters in the novel So You Want to Be a Wizard.
- A white hole appears in an episode of Andromeda when 40 nova bombs are launched into a black hole.
- In the opening scenes of "Tomorrow's Enterprise", the fourth season finale of Star Trek: Strange New Worlds, which premiered in September 2026, the Enterprise launches an exploratory probe into a white hole, where an explosion causes the temporal anomaly in the episode.

== See also ==
- Antimatter
- Antiparticle
- Arrow of time
- Big Bounce
- Black hole cosmology
- Black hole
- Conformal cyclic cosmology
- Dark energy
- Dark matter
- Exotic matter
- Gravitational singularity
- Many-worlds interpretation
- Multiverse
- Naked singularity
- Negative energy
- Negative mass
- Planck star
- Q star
- Quantum mechanics
- Quasar
- Solar System
- Spacetime
- Star
- Wormhole
