= Moisey Markov =

Soviet physicist-theorist

- Моисей Александрович Марков
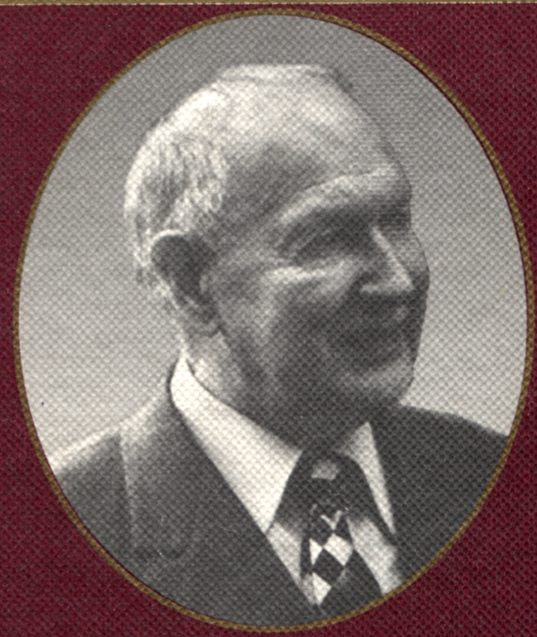
- Born: May 13, 1908; Rasskazovo, Tambov Governorate, Russian Empire
- Died: November 1, 1994 (aged 86); Moscow, Russia
- Education: Faculty of Physics of Moscow University
- Known for: underwater neutrino telescopes
- Scientific career
- Fields: theoretical physics

Moisey Alexandrovich Markov (Russian: Моисей Александрович Марков; 13 May 1908 - 1 November 1994) was a Soviet theoretical physicist who mostly worked in quantum mechanics, nuclear and particle physics. He is particularly known for having proposed the idea of underwater neutrino telescopes in 1960 that was originally developed in the master thesis of his student Igor Mikhailovich Zheleznykh.

Moisey Markov graduated from the Faculty of Physics of Moscow University in 1930. He worked at the Institute of Red Professors (1931-1933) and the Faculty of Physics of the Moscow State University (1933-1934). Since 1934 he worked for the Lebedev Physical Institute. In 1956-1962 he was the head of the Neutrino Physics Laboratory of the Institute for Nuclear Research.

Markov was a full member of the Soviet Academy of Sciences since 1966 (a corresponding member since 1953). In 1968-1988 he was the Secretary of the Department for Nuclear Physics of the Soviet Academy of Sciences. Markov was awarded Hero of Socialist Labor title and three Orders of Lenin. He died in 1994, 3 years after the dissolution of the Soviet Union.

Francis Halzen, who was awarded the 2026 Nobel Prize in Physics for the IceCube Neutrino Observatory, acknowledged Markov's idea:

How is such a detector built? That has also been known since 1960. I like to recall a photograph of Markov, who had the idea, together with Pontecorvo, because Pontecorvo had basically every idea in neutrino physics – except this one. This one was Markov’s idea, and the idea is explained in Figure 19. What you do is build a Cherenkov detector. You go deep in the ocean, or in the case of Russia, you go deep into Lake Baikal. It is dark. You install light sensors, filling a kilometre cube of water with them. You take your imaginary kilometre, and you detect particles coming through the earth. If a particle comes through the earth, it is a neutrino. No other particle comes through the earth. What does this neutrino do? It goes through the detector, and you do not see anything. However, about one time in a million, in the region we are interested in and where IceCube operates, the neutrino will crash into a proton. Then you get a nuclear reaction and the water turns blue, precisely as it does in a nuclear reactor, as I pointed out before.
