= Nonsingular black hole models =

Models of black holes without gravitational singularities

A nonsingular black hole model is a mathematical theory of black holes that avoids certain theoretical problems with the standard black hole model, including information loss and the unobservable nature of the black hole event horizon.

== Avoiding paradoxes in the standard black hole model ==
For a black hole to physically exist as a solution to Einstein's equation, it must form an event horizon in finite time relative to outside observers. This requires an accurate theory of black hole formation, of which several have been proposed. In 2007, Shuan Nan Zhang of Tsinghua University proposed a model in which the event horizon of a potential black hole only forms (or expands) after an object falls into the existing horizon, or after the horizon has exceeded the critical density. In other words, an infalling object causes the horizon of a black hole to expand, which only occurs after the object has fallen into the hole, allowing an observable horizon in finite time.

== Alternative black hole models ==
Nonsingular black hole models have been proposed since theoretical problems with black holes were first realized. Today some of the most viable candidates for the result of the collapse of a star with mass well above the Chandrasekhar limit include the gravastar and the dark energy star.

While black holes were a well-established part of mainstream physics for most of the end of the 20th century, alternative models received new attention when models proposed by George Chapline and later by Lawrence Krauss, Dejan Stojkovic, and Tanmay Vachaspati of Case Western Reserve University showed in several separate models that black hole horizons could not form.

Such research has attracted much media attention, as black holes have long captured the imagination of both scientists and the public for both their innate simplicity and mysteriousness. The recent theoretical results have therefore undergone much scrutiny and most of them are now ruled out by theoretical studies. For example, several alternative black hole models were shown to be unstable in extremely fast rotation, which, by conservation of angular momentum, would be a not unusual physical scenario for a collapsed star (see pulsar). Nevertheless, the existence of a stable model of a nonsingular black hole is still an open question.

=== Hayward metric ===
The Hayward metric is the simplest description of a black hole that is non-singular. The metric was written down by Sean Hayward as the minimal model that is regular, static, spherically symmetric and asymptotically flat.

=== Ayón-Beato–García metric ===
The Ayón-Beato–García model is the first exact charged regular black hole with a source. The model was proposed by Eloy Ayón Beato and Alberto García in 1998 based on the minimal coupling between a nonlinear electrodynamics model and general relativity, considering a static and spherically symmetric spacetime. Later the same authors reinterpreted the first non-singular black hole geometry, the Bardeen toy Model, as a nonlinear-electrodynamics-based regular black hole. Nowadays, it is known that the Ayón-Beato–García model may mimic the absorption properties of the Reissner–Nordström metric, from the perspective of the absorption of massless test scalar fields.

== Nonsingular black holes as dark matter ==
In 2024, Paul C.W. Davies, Damien A. Easson, and Phillip B. Levin proposed that nonsingular black holes are a viable candidate for dark matter. They showed that the nonsingular Schwarzschild-de Sitter black hole slowly evaporates, reaching a maximum but finite temperature, then forms a black hole remnant that does not have a singularity and whose mass is on the order of the Planck mass. This nonsingular black hole can comprise all of the dark matter in the observable universe because the fraction of primordial black holes that is dark matter is inversely proportional to the smallest mass primordial black hole that could have survived since the primordial era. It was previously thought that Hawking evaporation set the lower bound of primordial black holes to be 10^{12} kg, but nonsingular black holes, which form remnants and do not evaporate completely, lower this bound to the Planck mass, which is 10^{−8} kg. Thus Planck mass nonsingular black holes formed primordially can comprise all of the dark matter in the observable universe today.

== See also ==
- Exotic star
- Planck star
- Fuzzball (string theory)
