= Raj Kumar Pathria =

Indian theoretical physicist (1933–2026)

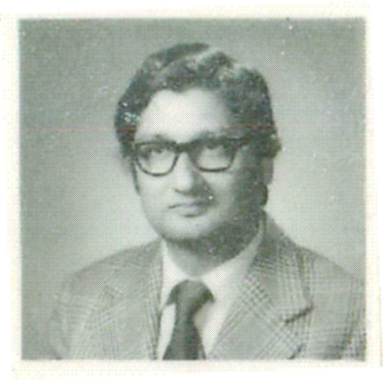
- Born: March 30, 1933; Ramdas near Amritsar, India
- Died: January 7, 2026 (aged 92); San Diego, California, U.S.
- Education: Panjab University; University of Delhi
- Known for: Statistical Mechanics (1972)
- Scientific career
- Fields: Statistical mechanics; General relativity
- Workplaces: University of Delhi; McMaster University; University of Alberta; Panjab University; University of Waterloo; University of Windsor; UC San Diego
- Doctoral advisor: F. C. Auluck; D. S. Kothari

Raj Kumar Pathria (March 30, 1933 – January 7, 2026) was an Indian theoretical physicist, a Distinguished Professor Emeritus at University of Waterloo, and an Urdu poet.

Pathria was known for his work on superfluidity in liquid helium, Lorentz transformation of thermodynamic quantities, an exact evaluation of lattice sums and finite-size effects in phase transitions.

Pathria was also the author of a graduate textbook on statistical mechanics, whose fourth edition appeared in the year 2021. He also wrote a book on relativity that was published as a Dover edition in the year 2003.

== Early life ==
Pathria was born in a middle-class Punjabi family to parents Ramji Das Pathria and Mela Devi Pathria in a small town named Ramdas, 28 miles to the north of Amritsar. He received his early education in a local high school and then joined the Hindu College, Amritsar for his FSc studies. He was placed on the 'Role of Honour' of that college in the year 1950.

== Career ==
Pathria obtained his BSc Honours and MSc Honours degrees from Panjab University, Hoshiarpur in July 1953 and July 1954, respectively, and soon thereafter, at the invitation of Professor F.C. Auluck, joined the graduate school of Physics at the University of Delhi for his doctoral studies, which he completed in March 1957. In February 1958, he joined the University of Delhi as a lecturer in physics and in April 1961 got promoted to readership. In August 1964, he left Delhi to take up a visiting professorship at McMaster University in Hamilton, Ontario, Canada.

Even though his field of research at the University of Delhi was primarily statistical mechanics, Pathria, during that time, became interested in relativity and in 1963, with the friendly cooperation of the Hindustan Publishing Corporation (India), produced a book entitled The Theory of Relativity. This maiden attempt at book-writing resulted in fabulous reviews from far and wide, especially from Professor William McCrea, who himself was a celebrated author on this subject. In 1974, the Pergamon Press, Oxford produced a second edition of that book and in 2003 Dover Publications of New York took that book under their wings. In Canada, Pathria continued his research in the diverse field of statistical mechanics; at the same time, he gave graduate courses on that subject at McMaster University and the University of Alberta. In 1967, he returned to India to take up professorship of theoretical physics at the Panjab University, Chandigarh, where (apart from conducting research in a variety of subjects in theoretical physics) he continued his mission of teaching the fundamentals of statistical mechanics.

In 1969 Pathria returned to Canada and, in addition to his other academic pursuits, continued to teach a variety of courses at the University of Waterloo and the University of Windsor. In 1972 the Pergammon Press, Oxford, published his classic text Statistical Mechanics, which became an instant success on the international scene. In the early 1990s, when his new publishers (Butterworth-Heinemann) persuaded Pathria to produce a second edition of this text, he sought the help of Surjit Singh, a former student of his from the Chandigarh days (who had also been a postdoctoral fellow with him at Waterloo during the years 1983–87). The result of this joint effort was a brand new edition of this book that came out in July 1996 and, like its predecessor, continued to be a bestseller.

Pathria retired from the University of Waterloo in August 1998 and, soon thereafter, moved to the west coast of the US and became an adjunct professor of physics at the University of California at San Diego, a position he continued to hold till 2010. In 2009, Pathria's newest publishers (Elsevier/Academic) prevailed upon him to produce a third edition of this book. He now sought the help of Paul Beale, of the University of Colorado at Boulder, whose co-authorship resulted in another brand new edition in March 2011. Ten years later, in 2021, Pathria and Beale produced a fourth edition of this book.

== Research interests ==
Raj Pathria has published over 110 research papers in a variety of international journals of repute. These papers are mainly spread over the following topics.

1. Superfluidity in liquid helium II --- one of the topics of Pathria’s Ph.D. thesis.
2. Lorentz transformation of thermodynamic quantities --- another topic of Pathria’s Ph.D. thesis.
3. Polymers and the Theory of Numbers --- a fascinating subject pursued in collaboration with V.S. Nanda.
4. Finite-size effects in systems undergoing phase transitions --- the main topic of Pathria's life-long pursuit.
5. An exact evaluation of ‘lattice sums’ using Poisson’s summation formula.
6. A study of ‘stochastic phenomena in sociology’ --- pursued in collaboration with Karmeshu.
7. Finite-time thermodynamics --- a new ripple in an old pond.
8. Relativity and Cosmology.

Pathria's complete list of publications can be seen here.

== Honours ==
- Fellowship of the American Physical Society, 1976
- Recipient of the Distinguished Teacher Award from the University of Waterloo, 1977—the citation for this award was presented at the UW convocation held on May 27, 1977
- Distinguished professor emeritus, University of Waterloo, 1999—this honor was bestowed upon Pathria at the UW convocation held on June 18, 1999

== Personal life and death ==
Pathria was married to a former student of his, named Raj Kumari (nee Gulati). They had two daughters and a son, as well as five grandchildren; they lost their younger daughter to cancer in 2011.

Pathria's hobbies were current events and Urdu poetry. Right from his childhood, Pathria was nurtured in an atmosphere replete with Urdu language, Urdu idiom and Urdu poetry. Having read and imbibed dozens of classics emanating from stalwarts like Mir, Ghalib, Zauq, Momin, Hali, Dagh and Iqbal, down to modernists like Asghar, Fani, Hasrat, Jigar, Firaq and Faiz, Pathria finally turned to writing Urdu poetry himself—but only around the year 1993 when he was close to retirement from physics.

Pathria—now pen-named Qais (after the legendary lover of the Arabic damsel Laila)—was now known for his latest compilation of Urdu Ghazals entitled Sahraa Sahraa.

Pathria died on January 7, 2026, at the age of 92.

== See also ==
- List of University of Waterloo people
