= Joel Smoller =

American mathematician

Joel Alan Smoller (2 January 1936 – 27 September 2017) was an American mathematician.

Joel Smoller was born in Brooklyn on 2 January 1936 to parents Benjamin, a taxicab driver, and Olga, who died when he was young. Smoller attended New York University, and completed his doctoral work at Purdue University in 1963, after which he taught at the University of Michigan. In 1970, he was appointed a full professor, and assumed the Lamberto Cesari Collegiate Professorship of Mathematics in 1998. He was editor of Transactions of the American Mathematical Society from 1981 to 1985, and later the Journal for Applicable Analysis. Smoller was award a Guggenheim Fellowship in 1979, the George David Birkhoff Prize in 2009, and elected to fellowship of the American Mathematical Society in 2013, a member of its inaugural class of fellows. Smoller retired in June 2017, and died, aged 81, on 27 September 2017. Following his death, the Joel Smoller Graduate Fellowship was established.
