= List of quantum gravity researchers =

This is a list of (some of) the researchers in quantum gravity who have Wikipedia articles.

- Jan Ambjørn: expert on dynamical triangulations who helped develop the causal dynamical triangulations approach to quantum gravity.
- Augusto Sagnotti: the physicist who demonstrated that perturbative quantum gravity diverges at two loops, and made a number of important contributions to string theory (most notably the discovery of the orientifold, which connects type I string theory to type IIB string theory).
- Giovanni Amelino-Camelia: physicist who developed the idea of doubly special relativity, and founded Quantum-Gravity phenomenology.
- Abhay Ashtekar: inventor of the Ashtekar variables, one of the founders of loop quantum gravity.
- John Baez: mathematical physicist who introduced the notion of spin foam in loop quantum gravity (a term originally introduced by Wheeler).
- Julian Barbour: philosopher and author of The End of Time, Absolute or Relative Motion?: The Discovery of Dynamics.
- John W. Barrett: mathematical physicist who helped develop the Barrett–Crane model of quantum gravity.
- Martin Bojowald: physicist who developed the application of loop quantum gravity to cosmology.
- Steve Carlip: expert on 3-dimensional quantum gravity.
- Louis Crane: mathematician who helped develop the Barrett–Crane model of quantum gravity.
- Bryce DeWitt: formulated the Wheeler–DeWitt equation for the wavefunction of the Universe with John Archibald Wheeler.
- Bianca Dittrich: mathematical physicist known for her contributions to loop quantum gravity and spin foam models, currently working on coarse-graining of spin foams.
- John Donoghue: the physicist who developed the effective field theory treatment for quantum predictions of General Relativity.
- Fay Dowker: physicist working on causal sets as well as the interpretation of quantum mechanics.
- David Finkelstein: physicist who has contributed much quantum relativity and the logical foundations of QR.
- Laurent Freidel: mathematical physicist known for his contributions to loop quantum gravity and spin foam models, in particular the Freidel-Krasnov model.
- Rodolfo Gambini: physicist who helped introduce loop quantum gravity; coauthor of Loops, Knots, Gauge Theories and Quantum Gravity.
- Gary Gibbons: physicist who has done important work on black holes.
- Brian Greene: physicist who is considered one of the world's foremost string theorists.
- James Hartle: physicist who helped develop the Hartle-Hawking wavefunction for the universe.
- Stephen Hawking: leading physicist, expert on black holes and discoverer of Hawking radiation who helped develop the Hartle-Hawking wavefunction for the universe.
- Michał Heller: mathematical physicist, philosopher & theologian working on non-commutative geometry.
- Christopher Isham: physicist who focuses on conceptual problems in quantum gravity.
- Ted Jacobson: physicist who helped develop loop quantum gravity.
- Michio Kaku: physicist one of the foremost leading String theorist and also known for the Popular Science.
- Renate Loll: physicist who worked on loop quantum gravity and more recently helped develop the causal dynamical triangulations approach to quantum gravity.
- Luboš Motl: physicist who worked on string theory.
- Fotini Markopoulou-Kalamara: physicist who works on loop quantum gravity and spin network models that take causality into account.
- Roger Penrose: mathematical physicist who invented spin networks and twistor theory.
- Jorge Pullin: physicist who helped develop loop quantum gravity, co-author of Loops, Knots, Gauge Theories and Quantum Gravity.
- Carlo Rovelli: one of the founders and major contributors to loop quantum gravity.
- Lee Smolin: one of the founders and major contributors to loop quantum gravity.
- Rafael Sorkin: physicist, primary proponent of the causal set approach to quantum gravity.
- Andrew Strominger: physicist who works on string theory.
- Leonard Susskind: physicist who is considered to be one of the three fathers of string theory.
- Frank J. Tipler: mathematical physicist.
- Bill Unruh: physicist engaged in the study of semiclassical gravity and responsible for the discovery of the so-called Unruh effect.
- Cumrun Vafa: physicist and developer of F-theory, known for Vafa-Witten theorem and Gopakumar-Vafa conjecture.
- Robert Wald: physicist in the field of quantum field theory in curved spacetime.
- Anzhong Wang: physicist, major contributor to Horava-Lifshitz gravity; String theory and applications to cosmology.
- Silke Weinfurtner: physicist, in the field of analog gravity.
- Paul S. Wesson: physicist, cosmologist and writer, known as founder of the "Space-time Consortium" and his work on Kaluza–Klein theory.
- John Archibald Wheeler: physicist in the field of quantum gravity due to his development, with Bryce DeWitt, of the Wheeler–DeWitt equation.
- Edward Witten: mathematical physicist in string theory and M-Theory

== See also ==
- List of loop quantum gravity researchers
- List of string theorists
- List of contributors to general relativity
