= List of loop quantum gravity researchers =

This is a list of notable researchers in the physics field of loop quantum gravity.

- Abhay Ashtekar, Pennsylvania State University, United States
- John Baez, University of California, Riverside, United States
- Aurélien Barrau, Université Grenoble Alpes, Grenoble, France
- John W. Barrett, University of Nottingham, United Kingdom
- Eugenio Bianchi, Pennsylvania State University, United States
- Martin Bojowald, Pennsylvania State University, United States
- Alejandro Corichi, National Autonomous University of Mexico, Mexico
- Bianca Dittrich, Perimeter Institute for Theoretical Physics, Canada
- Laurent Freidel, Perimeter Institute for Theoretical Physics, Canada
- Rodolfo Gambini, University of the Republic, Uruguay
- Jerzy Lewandowski, University of Warsaw, Poland
- Jorge Pullin, Louisiana State University, United States
- Carlo Rovelli, Centre de Physique Théorique, Centre National de la Recherche Scientifique (CNRS), Aix-Marseille University and University of Toulon, Marseille, France
- Lee Smolin, Perimeter Institute for Theoretical Physics, Canada
- Francesca Vidotto, University of Western Ontario, Canada

== See also ==
- List of quantum gravity researchers
- List of contributors to general relativity
