= Abhay Ashtekar =

Indian-American theoretical physicist

Abhay Vasant Ashtekar
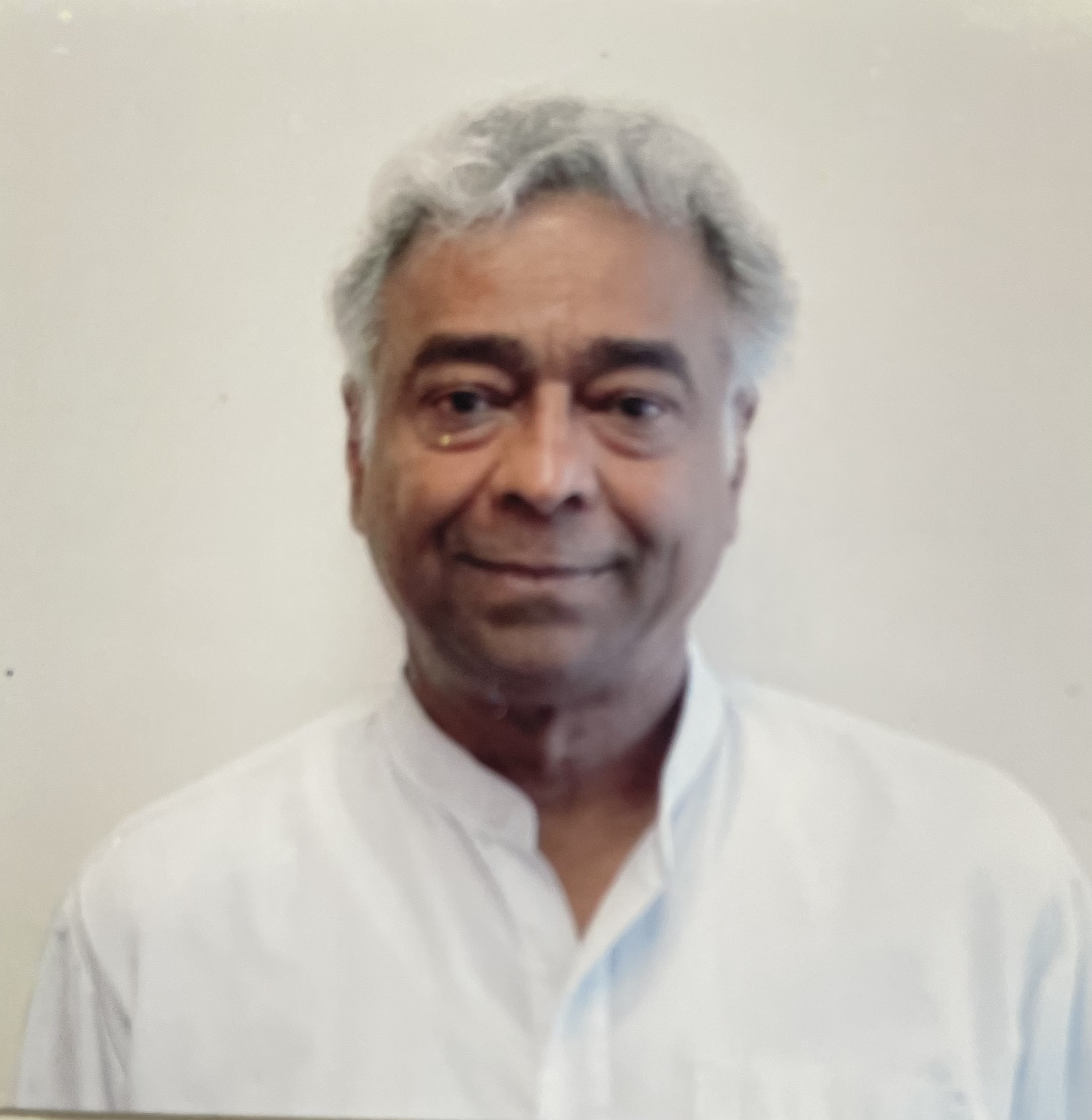
- Born: 5 July 1949 (age 77); Shirpur, Maharashtra, India
- Education: University of Bombay; University of Texas, Austin; University of Chicago
- Known for: Ashtekar variables Loop quantum gravity Loop quantum cosmology Quasi-local black hole horizons
- Awards: Member of National Academy of Sciences, first Gravity Prize by the Gravity Research Foundation, Massachusetts, Einstein Prize, The Senior Forschungspreis of the Alexander von Humboldt Foundation
- Scientific career
- Fields: Theoretical physics
- Workplaces: Pennsylvania State University
- Doctoral advisor: Robert Geroch

Abhay Ashtekar (born July 5, 1949) is an Indian-American theoretical physicist known for his work on general relativity, quantum gravity, and cosmology. He is Atherton Professor, Evan Pugh University Professor, and the Eberly Chair in Physics Emeritus at Pennsylvania State University. He also holds Distinguished Visiting Chair appointments at the Perimeter Institute for Theoretical Physics in Canada and the Raman Research Institute in India.

Ashtekar is the originator of the Ashtekar variables, a reformulation of general relativity that led to the development of loop quantum gravity. He has contributed extensively to loop quantum gravity and its cosmological application, loop quantum cosmology. His research has addressed the asymptotic structure of spacetime, gravitational waves in nonlinear general relativity, quantum geometry at the Planck scale, black hole physics, and the quantum description of the Big Bang.

He has authored or co-authored approximately 300 scientific papers and written or edited nine scholarly books. He has delivered more than 200 plenary lectures at international conferences and workshops.

Ashtekar is a member of the United States National Academy of Sciences and a recipient of the Einstein Prize of the American Physical Society. From 1993 to 2021, he served as the founding director of the Institute for Gravitation and the Cosmos at Penn State.

== Early life and education ==
Ashtekar was born in Shirpur, India, on July 5, 1949. His father was a senior civil servant, and the family relocated frequently. He lived in six towns in Maharashtra before completing high school in Kolhapur in 1965. He ranked among the top 15 students in the Maharashtra State Examination and received a National Merit Scholarship.

Although selected to attend the Indian Institutes of Technology, Ashtekar chose to pursue pure science and enrolled at the Institute of Science, Bombay. He graduated with honors from the University of Bombay, majoring in physics with a minor in mathematics. During this period, he was mentored by B. M. Udgaonkar and S. M. Chitre at the Tata Institute of Fundamental Research. As an undergraduate, he identified a small error in The Feynman Lectures on Physics and corresponded with Richard Feynman, who acknowledged the mistake.

== Career ==
Ashtekar developed an interest in general relativity and cosmology and applied to the University of Texas at Austin. Despite not holding a master's degree, he was admitted to the Ph.D. program in physics in 1969. He worked under the supervision of Robert Geroch and later moved with him to the University of Chicago, where the relativity group was led by Subrahmanyan Chandrasekhar. He completed his Ph.D. in 1974.

He subsequently held postdoctoral positions at the Mathematical Institute, University of Oxford, working with Roger Penrose, and at the Enrico Fermi Institute at the University of Chicago. At Oxford, he developed an algebraic approach to quantum field theory in curved spacetime and, with Richard Hansen, analyzed the asymptotic structure of the gravitational field.

=== Academic appointments ===
Ashtekar joined the University of Clermont-Ferrand in France as Professeur Associé, where he worked on gravitational waves and introduced elements of asymptotic quantization. In 1980, he was appointed Assistant Professor at Syracuse University under a National Science Foundation initiative. He was promoted to Associate Professor in 1982, Professor in 1984, Distinguished Professor in 1988, and Erastus Franklin Holden Professor in 1992.

In 1983, he accepted an appointment to the Chaire de Gravitation, at Pierre et Marie Curie Université, in Paris, but chose to return to Syracuse University in 1986.

In 1993, Ashtekar joined Pennsylvania State University as Eberly Chair in Physics and established a new Center for Gravitation. In 1999, he declined an offer of a Directorship at the Max Planck Institute for Gravitational Physics in Germany. He has remained at Penn State since 1993.

=== Institute for Gravitation and the Cosmos ===
In 2001, Ashtekar chaired the executive committee of a second Center at Penn State focused on Gravitational Wave Physics. It was funded by the National Science Foundation in the very first year of their Physics Frontier Centers initiative.

The two centers became part of the Institute for Gravitation and the Cosmos (IGC), which expanded to include cosmology and multimessenger astronomy and astrophysics. Ashtekar served as director of the IGC and its predecessor centers from 1993 until stepping down in 2021.

== Research ==
=== Classical general relativity ===
Ashtekar's work in classical general relativity includes studies of the asymptotic structure of spacetime, gravitational radiation, and black hole dynamics. With collaborators including Richard Hansen and Anne Magnon, he identified the asymptotic symmetry group at spatial infinity, known as the Spi group, and analyzed associated conserved quantities, especially the subtleties in the notion of angular momentum of space-times with gravitational waves.

His research on gravitational waves demonstrated that their physical content is encoded in the curvature of a connection defined on Penrose's conformal boundary of spacetime. These ideas provided the foundation for later work on infrared effects, gravitational memory and celestial holography and recent efforts to improve gravitational waveform modeling for LIGO–Virgo data analysis.

Ashtekar and collaborators, including Badri Krishnan introduced quasi-local horizons, including isolated and dynamical horizons, which are now widely used in numerical simulations of black hole formation and mergers, and in investigations of the black hole evaporation due to emission of quantum radiation discovered by Stephen Hawking. He has also studied asymptotic properties of gravitational fields in spacetimes with nonzero cosmological constant.

=== Quantum gravity and Ashtekar variables ===
Ashtekar's research on quantum gravity began with work on quantum field theory in curved spacetime, including algebraic and Kähler-geometric methods. In the 1980s, he developed a non-perturbative quantization of the radiative modes of gravity and identified connections between infrared issues and asymptotic symmetries.

In 1986, he reformulated general relativity using self-dual connections, now known as Ashtekar variables. This reformulation simplified Einstein's equations and cast general relativity in a gauge-theoretic form, enabling the development of loop quantum gravity.

In 2011, the international conference Loops 11: Celebrating 25 Years of Loop Quantum Gravity was held in Madrid to commemorate the 25th anniversary of Ashtekar's landmark paper introducing the variables that helped launch the loop quantum gravity research program.

=== Loop quantum gravity and cosmology ===
Loop quantum gravity predicts a quantum geometry in which geometric operators corresponding to area and volume have discrete spectra. The theory was further developed by numerous researchers, including Ivan Agullo, Jerzy Lewandowski, Carlo Rovelli, Lee Smolin, and Thomas Thiemann, many of whom are former members of Ashtekar's research group, and by their own students.

In loop quantum cosmology, Ashtekar and collaborators showed that quantum geometric effects resolve the classical Big Bang singularity, replacing it with a cosmological bounce. They also showed that these quantum geometric effects can modify the evolution of primordial perturbations and may leave observable imprints in the cosmic microwave background, potentially accounting for certain large-scale anomalies.

In black hole physics, loop quantum gravity provides a microscopic account of black hole entropy. It has also been applied to the study of black hole evaporation through frameworks based on quantum geometry and quasi-local or isolated horizons.

== Outreach, service, and mentoring ==
Ashtekar founded the Frontiers of Science public lecture series at Penn State, which has been held annually for more than three decades and was renamed the Ashtekar Lectures on Frontiers of Science in 2020.

He has served as President of the International Society on General Relativity and Gravitation and as Chair of the Division of Gravitational Physics of the American Physical Society. He has served on editorial boards of major journals and was Editor-in-Chief of General Relativity and Gravitation: A Centenary Perspective.

The American Institute of Physics conducted an oral history interview with Ashtekar for the Niels Bohr Library in 2021. He has mentored over 100 postdocs and graduate students including;

Postdoctoral Researchers

- Laurent Freidel — Professor, Perimeter Institute, Waterloo, Canada
- Viqar Husain — Professor, Department of Mathematics and Statistics, University of New Brunswick, Canada
- Jerzy Lewandowski — Chair of Gravitation, University of Warsaw, Poland
- Renate Loll — Professor of Theoretical Physics, Radboud University, The Netherlands
- Jorma Louko — Professor of Mathematical Physics, University of Nottingham, UK
- Donald Marolf — Professor, Physics Department, University of California, Santa Barbara, USA
- José Mourão — Professor and Chair, Mathematics Department, University of Lisbon, Portugal
- Jorge Pullin — Professor and Hearne Chair, Louisiana State University, USA
- Thomas Thiemann — Professor, Chair of Theoretical Physics, Friedrich-Alexander-Universität, Germany

Ph.D. Students

- Alejandro Corichi — Professor, National Autonomous University of Mexico (UNAM)
- Jonathan Engle — Professor, Florida Atlantic University, USA
- Stephen Fairhurst — Professor, Cardiff University, UK; Spokesperson of the LIGO Scientific Collaboration
- Kirill Krasnov — Professor of Mathematical Physics, University of Nottingham, UK
- Badri Krishnan — Professor and Chair, Fundamental Physics from Strong Gravity, Radboud University, The Netherlands
- David Sloan — Chief Scientific Officer, Fundamental Questions Institute
- Chris Van Den Broeck — Professor, Utrecht University, The Netherlands
- Edward Wilson‑Ewing — Professor, Department of Mathematics and Statistics, University of New Brunswick, Canada

== Selected honors and awards ==
- Einstein Prize, American Physical Society (2019)
- Member, United States National Academy of Sciences (2016)
- Fellow of the International Society on General Relativity and Gravitation (2016)
- Distinguished Visiting Research Professor, Perimeter Institute, Canada (2014-)
- Honorary Doctorate (Dr. rer. nat. h.c.), Aix-Marseille University (2010)
- Fellow, American Association for the Advancement of Science (2008)
- President, International Society on General Relativity and Gravitation (2007–2010)
- Kramers Chair in Theoretical Physics, University of Utrecht (2006)
- Sir C. V. Raman Chair, Indian Academy of Sciences (2004–2005)
- Honorary Doctorate (Dr. rer. nat. h.c.), Friedrich Schiller University Jena (2005)
- Senior Forschungspreis, Alexander von Humboldt Foundation (2004)
- Foreign Fellow, Indian National Academy of Sciences (1997)
- Fellow, American Physical Society (1997)
- Honorary Fellow, Indian Academy of Sciences (1996)
- Alfred P. Sloan Research Fellowship (1981–1985)
- First Prize, Gravity Research Foundation (1977)

== Selected publications ==
- Ashtekar and A. Magnon, Translation from French of Elie Cartan's work, "Sur les Varietes a Connexion Affine et la Relativite Generale" with a Commentary and Foreword by A. Trautman. Bibliopolis, Naples, 1986, 199 pages.
- Ashtekar and J. Stachel, (Editors); Conceptual Problems of Quantum Gravity. Proceedings of the 1988 Osgood Hill Conference (Birkhauser, N. Y., 1991), 602 pages.
- Ashtekar, Lectures on Non-perturbative Canonical Gravity, (Notes prepared in collaboration with R.S. Tate), (World Scientific Singapore, 1991), 334 pages.
- Ashtekar (Editor), 100 Years of Relativity – Spacetime structure: Einstein and Beyond (World Scientific, Singapore, 2005).
- Ashtekar (Editor in Chief), B. Berger, J, Isenberg and M.A.H. MacCallum (editors), General Relativity and Gravitation: A Centenary Perspective, commissioned by the International Society on General Relativity and Gravitation to celebrate the 100th anniversary of Einstein's discovery of general relativity (Cambridge University Press, Cambridge, 2015).

== Books ==
1. A. Magnon and A. Ashtekar, Translation from French of Élie Cartan's work, "Sur les variétés à connexion affine et la théorie de la relativité généralisée" with a commentary and foreword by A. Trautman, Bibliopolis, Naples, 1986, 199 pages.
2. A. Ashtekar, Asymptotic Quantization. Bibliopolis, Naples, 1987, 107 pages.
3. A. Ashtekar, (with invited contributions) New Perspectives in Canonical Gravity. Bibliopolis, Naples, 1988, 324 pages.
4. A. Ashtekar and J. Stachel, Editors; Conceptual Problems of Quantum Gravity. Proceedings of the 1988 Osgood Hill Conference (Birkhauser, N. Y., 1991), 602 pages.
5. A. Ashtekar, Lectures on Non-perturbative Canonical Gravity, (Notes prepared in collaboration with R.S. Tate), (World Scientific Singapore, 1991), 334 pages.
6. A. Ashtekar, R.C. Cohen, D. Howard, J. Renn, S. Sarkar and A. Shimony (Editors), Revisiting the Foundations of Relativistic Physics, Festschrift in honor of John Stachel, Boston Studies in Philosophy of Science, Volume 234, (Kluwer Academic, 2003).

== See also ==
- List of loop quantum gravity researchers
- Big Bounce
- Carlo Rovelli
- Lee Smolin
- Martin Bojowald
