= Regge calculus =

Formalism in general relativity

In general relativity, Regge calculus is a formalism for producing simplicial approximations of spacetimes that are solutions to the Einstein field equation. The calculus was introduced by the Italian theoretician Tullio Regge in 1961.

== Overview ==
The starting point for Regge's work is the fact that every four dimensional time orientable Lorentzian manifold admits a triangulation into simplices. Furthermore, the spacetime curvature can be expressed in terms of deficit angles associated with 2-faces where arrangements of 4-simplices meet. These 2-faces play the same role as the vertices where arrangements of triangles meet in a triangulation of a 2-manifold, which is easier to visualize. Here a vertex with a positive angular deficit represents a concentration of positive Gaussian curvature, whereas a vertex with a negative angular deficit represents a concentration of negative Gaussian curvature.

The deficit angles can be computed directly from the various edge lengths in the triangulation, which is equivalent to saying that the Riemann curvature tensor can be computed from the metric tensor of a Lorentzian manifold. Regge showed that the vacuum field equations can be reformulated as a restriction on these deficit angles. He then showed how this can be applied to evolve an initial spacelike hyperslice according to the vacuum field equation.

The result is that, starting with a triangulation of some spacelike hyperslice (which must itself satisfy a certain constraint equation), one can eventually obtain a simplicial approximation to a vacuum solution. This can be applied to difficult problems in numerical relativity such as simulating the collision of two black holes.

The elegant idea behind Regge calculus has motivated the construction of further generalizations of this idea. In particular, Regge calculus has been adapted to study quantum gravity.

== Regge action and Regge equations ==
In a $d$-dimensional piecewise flat simplicial manifold the curvature is concentrated on the $(d-2)$-dimensional simplices, called hinges (triangles in four dimensions). To each hinge $h$ one associates the deficit angle

$$\varepsilon_h = 2\pi - \sum_{\sigma \supset h} \theta_{\sigma h},$$

where the sum runs over the $d$-simplices $\sigma$ sharing the hinge and $\theta_{\sigma h}$ is the dihedral angle of $\sigma$ at $h$. All these angles are determined by the edge lengths of the triangulation, so that the edge lengths play the role of the metric tensor. The discrete counterpart of the Einstein–Hilbert action is the Regge action

$$S_{\text{Regge}} = \frac{1}{8\pi G} \sum_h A_h \, \varepsilon_h ,$$

where $A_h$ is the $(d-2)$-volume (in four dimensions, the area) of the hinge.

Varying the action with respect to the edge lengths $l_i$ gives the field equations. Because of an identity due to Ludwig Schläfli, the variation of the deficit angles drops out, and the Regge equations take the form

$$\sum_h \frac{\partial A_h}{\partial l_i} \, \varepsilon_h = 0,$$

one equation for each edge $i$. They are the discrete analogue of the vacuum Einstein field equations; matter is included through additional terms in the action.

== Convergence to the continuum ==
That the Regge action converges to the Einstein–Hilbert action as the triangulation is refined was proved by Jeff Cheeger, Werner Müller and Robert Schrader in 1984 under suitable regularity conditions on the simplices (the "fatness" of the simplices must remain bounded away from zero).

== Applications ==
=== Classical relativity ===
Regge calculus was proposed early on as a tool for numerical relativity, since it needs no coordinates and encodes the topology of spacetime directly in the triangulation. Rafael Sorkin formulated the time-evolution problem in Regge calculus in 1975. Applications include cosmological models, the Schwarzschild geometry and the propagation of gravitational waves, although finite-difference methods have remained dominant in numerical relativity.

=== Quantum gravity ===
Regge calculus provides a finite-dimensional version of the path integral over geometries. In quantum Regge calculus one integrates over the edge lengths of a fixed triangulation, whereas in dynamical triangulations the edge length is fixed and one sums over triangulations.

In 1968, Giorgio Ponzano and Regge showed that the 6-j symbols of angular momentum recoupling are described, in the limit of large angular momenta, by the Regge action of a tetrahedron whose edge lengths correspond to the angular momenta (the Ponzano–Regge model). This observation is the historical starting point of the spin foam models of loop quantum gravity, whose semiclassical limit again reproduces the Regge action. More recent work generalizes the calculus to simplices of constant curvature, which incorporates a cosmological constant.

== See also ==
- Numerical relativity
- Quantum gravity
- Euclidean quantum gravity
- Piecewise linear manifold
- Euclidean simplex
- Path integral formulation
- Lattice gauge theory
- Wheeler–DeWitt equation
- Mathematics of general relativity
- Causal dynamical triangulation
- Ricci calculus
- Twisted geometries
