= Sprinkling =

Sprinkling can refer to:

- Aspersion, a method of baptism, particularly used for infant baptism.
- Sprinkling, a type of character in the video game Viva Piñata.
- Sprinkling is a method of creating a causal set from a Lorentzian manifold.
