= Causal dynamical triangulation =

Hypothetical approach to quantum gravity with emergent spacetime

Causal dynamical triangulation (CDT), theorized by Renate Loll, Jan Ambjørn and Jerzy Jurkiewicz, is an approach to quantum gravity that, like loop quantum gravity, is background independent.

This means that it does not assume any pre-existing arena (dimensional space) but, rather, attempts to show how the spacetime fabric itself evolves.

There is evidence that, at large scales, CDT approximates the familiar 4-dimensional spacetime but shows spacetime to be 2-dimensional near the Planck scale, and reveals a fractal structure on slices of constant time. These interesting results agree with the findings of Oliver Lauscher and Martin Reuter, who use an approach called quantum Einstein gravity (QEG), and with other recent theoretical work.

== Introduction ==
Near the Planck scale, the structure of spacetime itself is supposed to be constantly changing due to quantum fluctuations and topological fluctuations. CDT theory uses a triangulation process which varies dynamically and follows deterministic rules, to map out how this can evolve into dimensional spaces similar to that of our universe.

Using a structure called a simplex, it divides spacetime into tiny triangular sections. A simplex is the multidimensional analogue of a triangle [2-simplex]; a 3-simplex is usually called a tetrahedron, while the 4-simplex, which is the basic building block in this theory, is also known as the pentachoron. Each simplex is geometrically flat, but simplices can be "glued" together in a variety of ways to create curved spacetimes. Whereas previous attempts at triangulation of quantum spaces have produced jumbled universes with far too many dimensions, or minimal universes with too few, CDT avoids this problem by allowing only those configurations in which the timelines of all joined edges of simplices agree.

== Derivation ==
CDT is a modification of quantum Regge calculus where spacetime is discretized by approximating it with a piecewise linear manifold in a process called triangulation. In this process, a d-dimensional spacetime is considered as formed by space slices that are labeled by a discrete time variable t. Each space slice is approximated by a simplicial manifold composed by regular (d − 1)-dimensional simplices and the connection between these slices is made by a piecewise linear manifold of d-simplices. In place of a smooth manifold there is a network of triangulation nodes, where space is locally flat (within each simplex) but globally curved, as with the individual faces and the overall surface of a geodesic dome. The line segments which make up each triangle can represent either a space-like or time-like extent, depending on whether they lie on a given time slice, or connect a vertex at time t with one at time t + 1. The crucial development is that the network of simplices is constrained to evolve in a way that preserves causality. This allows a path integral to be calculated non-perturbatively, by summation of all possible (allowed) configurations of the simplices, and correspondingly, of all possible spatial geometries.

Simply put, each individual simplex is like a building block of spacetime, but the edges that have a time arrow must agree in direction, wherever the edges are joined. This rule preserves causality, a feature missing from previous "triangulation" theories. When simplexes are joined in this way, the complex evolves in an orderly fashion, and eventually creates the observed framework of dimensions. CDT builds upon the earlier work of John W. Barrett, Louis Crane, and John C. Baez, but by introducing the causality constraint as a fundamental rule (influencing the process from the very start), Loll, Ambjørn, and Jurkiewicz created something different.

== Related theories ==
CDT has some similarities with loop quantum gravity, especially with its spin foam formulations. For example, the Lorentzian Barrett–Crane model is essentially a non-perturbative prescription for computing path integrals, just like CDT. There are important differences, however. Spin foam formulations of quantum gravity use different degrees of freedom and different Lagrangians. For example, in CDT, the distance, or "the interval", between any two points in a given triangulation can be calculated exactly (triangulations are eigenstates of the distance operator). This is not true for spin foams or loop quantum gravity in general. Moreover, in spin foams the discreteness is thought to be fundamental, while in CDT it is viewed as a regularization of the path integral, to be removed by the continuum limit.

Another approach to quantum gravity that is closely related to causal dynamical triangulation is called causal sets. Both CDT and causal sets attempt to model the spacetime with a discrete causal structure. The main difference between the two is that the causal set approach is relatively general, whereas CDT assumes a more specific relationship between the lattice of spacetime events and geometry. Consequently, the Lagrangian of CDT is constrained by the initial assumptions to the extent that it can be written down explicitly and analyzed (see, for example, hep-th/0505154, page 5), whereas there is more freedom in how one might write down an action for causal-set theory.

In the continuum limit, CDT is probably related to some version of Hořava–Lifshitz gravity. In fact, both theories rely on a foliation of spacetime, and thus they can be expected to lie in the same universality class. In 1+1 dimensions they have actually been shown to be the same theory, while in higher dimensions there are only some hints, as understanding the continuum limit of CDT remains a difficult task.

== See also ==
- Asymptotic safety in quantum gravity
- Causal sets
- Fractal cosmology
- Loop quantum gravity
- 5-cell
- Planck scale
- Quantum gravity
- Regge calculus
- Simplex
- Simplicial manifold
- Spin foam
