= Big Bounce =

Model for the origin of the universe

An animation of the Big Bounce

The Big Bounce hypothesis is a cosmological model for the origin of the known universe. It was originally suggested as a phase of the cyclic model or oscillatory universe interpretation of the Big Bang, where the first cosmological event was the result of the collapse of a previous universe. It receded from serious consideration in the early 1980s after inflation theory emerged as a solution to the horizon problem, which had arisen from advances in observations revealing the large-scale structure of the universe.

Inflation was found to be inevitably eternal, creating an infinity of different universes with typically different properties, suggesting that the properties of the observable universe are a matter of chance. An alternative concept that included a Big Bounce was conceived as a predictive and falsifiable possible solution to the horizon problem. Investigation continued as of 2022.

== Expansion and contraction ==
The concept of the Big Bounce envisions the Big Bang as the beginning of a period of expansion that followed a period of contraction. In this view, one could talk of a "Big Crunch" followed by a "Big Bang" or, more simply, a "Big Bounce". This concept suggests that we could exist at any point in an infinite sequence of universes, or conversely, the current universe could be the very first iteration. However, if the condition of the interval phase "between bounces"—considered the "hypothesis of the primeval atom"—is taken into full contingency, such enumeration may be meaningless because that condition could represent a singularity in time at each instance if such perpetual repeats (cycles) were absolute and undifferentiated.

The main idea behind the quantum theory of a Big Bounce is that, as density approaches infinity, the behavior of quantum foam changes. All the so-called fundamental physical constants, including the speed of light in vacuum, need not remain constant during a Big Crunch, especially in the time interval smaller than that in which measurement may never be possible (one unit of Planck time, roughly 10^{−43} seconds) spanning or bracketing the point of inflection.

== History ==
Big Bounce models were endorsed on largely aesthetic grounds by cosmologists including Willem de Sitter, Carl Friedrich von Weizsäcker, George McVittie, and George Gamow (who stressed that "from the physical point of view we must forget entirely about the precollapse period").

By the early 1980s, the advancing precision and scope of observational cosmology had revealed that the large-scale structure of the universe is flat, homogeneous, and isotropic, a finding later accepted as the cosmological principle to apply at scales beyond roughly 300 million light-years. This led cosmologists to seek an explanation to the horizon problem, which questioned how distant regions of the universe could have identical properties without ever being in light-like communication. A solution was proposed to be a period of exponential expansion of space in the early universe, which formed the basis of what became known as inflation theory. Following the brief inflationary period, the universe continues to expand at a slower rate.

Various formulations of inflation theory and their detailed implications became the subject of intense theoretical study. Without a compelling alternative, inflation became the leading solution to the horizon problem.

The phrase "Big Bounce" appeared in scientific literature in 1987, when it was first used in the title of a pair of articles (in German) in Stern und Weltraum by Wolfgang Priester and Hans-Joachim Blome. It reappeared in 1988 in Iosif Rozental's Big Bang, Big Bounce, a revised English-language translation of a Russian-language book (by a different title), and in a 1991 English-language article by Priester and Blome in Astronomy and Astrophysics. The phrase originated as the title of a novel by Elmore Leonard in 1969, shortly after increased public awareness of the Big Bang model with of the discovery of the cosmic microwave background by Penzias and Wilson in 1965.

The idea of the existence of a big bounce in the very early universe has found diverse support in works based on loop quantum gravity. In loop quantum cosmology, a branch of loop quantum gravity, the big bounce was first discovered in February 2006 for isotropic and homogeneous models by Abhay Ashtekar, Tomasz Pawlowski, and Parampreet Singh at Pennsylvania State University. This result has been generalized to various other models by different groups, and includes the case of spatial curvature, cosmological constant, anisotropies, and Fock quantized inhomogeneities.

Martin Bojowald, an assistant professor of physics at Pennsylvania State University, published a study in July 2007 detailing work related to loop quantum gravity that claimed to mathematically solve the time before the Big Bang, which would give new weight to the oscillatory universe and Big Bounce theories.

One of the main problems with the Big Bang theory is that there is a singularity of zero volume and infinite energy at the moment of the Big Bang. This is normally interpreted as a breakdown of physics as we know it; in this case, of the theory of general relativity. This is why one expects quantum effects to become important and avoid a singularity.

However, research in loop quantum cosmology purported to show that a previously existing universe collapses not to a singularity, but to a point where the quantum effects of gravity become so strongly repulsive that the universe rebounds back out, forming a new branch. Throughout this collapse and bounce, the evolution is unitary.

Bojowald also claimed that some properties of the universe that collapsed to form ours can be determined; however, other properties are not determinable due to some uncertainty principle. This result has been disputed by different groups, which show that due to restrictions on fluctuations stemming from the uncertainty principle, there are strong constraints on the change in relative fluctuations across the bounce.

While the existence of the Big Bounce has still to be demonstrated from loop quantum gravity, the robustness of its main features has been confirmed using exact results and several studies involving numerical simulations using high performance computing in loop quantum cosmology.

In 2006, it was proposed that the application of loop quantum gravity techniques to Big Bang cosmology can lead to a bounce that need not be cyclic.

In 2010, Roger Penrose advanced a general relativity-based theory which he called the "conformal cyclic cosmology". The theory explains that the universe will expand until all matter decays and ultimately turns to light. Since nothing in the universe would have any time or distance scale associated with it, the universe becomes identical with the Big Bang, resulting in a type of Big Crunch that becomes the next Big Bang, thus perpetuating the next cycle.

In 2011, Nikodem Popławski showed that a nonsingular Big Bounce appears naturally in the Einstein–Cartan–Sciama–Kibble theory of gravity. This theory extends general relativity by removing a constraint of the symmetry of the affine connection and regarding its antisymmetric part, the torsion tensor, as a dynamical variable. The minimal coupling between torsion and Dirac spinors generates a spin-spin interaction which is significant in fermionic matter at extremely high densities. Such an interaction avoids the unphysical Big Bang singularity, replacing it with a cusp-like bounce at a finite minimum scale factor, before which the universe was contracting. This scenario also explains why the present Universe at the largest scales appears spatially flat, homogeneous, and isotropic, providing a physical alternative to cosmic inflation.

In 2012, a new theory of a nonsingular Big Bounce was constructed within the frame of standard Einstein gravity. This theory combines the benefits of matter bounce and ekpyrotic cosmology. Particularly, in the homogeneous and isotropic background cosmological solution, the BKL instability is unstable to the growth of anisotropic stress, which is resolved in this theory. Moreover, curvature perturbations seeded in matter contraction can form a nearly scale-invariant primordial power spectrum and thus provide a consistent mechanism to explain the cosmic microwave background (CMB) observations.

== Critics ==
According to a study published in Physical Review Letters in May 2023, the Big Bounce should have left marks in the primordial light, known as the cosmic microwave background (CMB), but comparing observations conducted by the Planck satellite with the simulated CMB in the case the Universe bounced on itself only once, that particular bounce signature was not found.

== See also ==
- Abhay Ashtekar – Indian-American theoretical physicist
- Anthropic principle – Hypothesis about sapient life and the universe
- Big Crunch – Hypothetical scenario for the ultimate fate of the universe
- Big Freeze – Possible fate of the universe
- Big Rip – Cosmological model
- Black hole – Compact astronomical body
- Eternal return – Concept of perpetual recurrence of time
- False vacuum – Hypothetical vacuum, less stable than true vacuum
- John Archibald Wheeler – American theoretical physicist (1911–2008)
- Loop quantum cosmology – Finite, symmetry-reduced model of loop quantum gravity
- Loop quantum gravity – Theory of quantum gravity merging quantum mechanics and general relativity
- Supernova – Astrophysical phenomenon
