= Loop quantum cosmology =

Finite, symmetry-reduced model of loop quantum gravity

Loop quantum cosmology (LQC) is a finite, symmetry-reduced model of loop quantum gravity (LQG) that predicts a "quantum bridge" between contracting and expanding cosmological branches.

The distinguishing feature of LQC is the prominent role played by the quantum geometry effects of loop quantum gravity (LQG). In particular, quantum geometry creates a brand new repulsive force which is totally negligible at low space-time curvature but rises very rapidly in the Planck regime, overwhelming the classical gravitational attraction and thereby resolving singularities of general relativity. Once singularities are resolved, the conceptual paradigm of cosmology changes and one has to revisit many of the standard issues—e.g., the "horizon problem"—from a new perspective.

Since LQG is based on a specific quantum theory of Riemannian geometry, geometric observables display a fundamental discreteness that play a key role in quantum dynamics: While predictions of LQC are very close to those of quantum geometrodynamics (QGD) away from the Planck regime, there is a dramatic difference once densities and curvatures enter the Planck scale. In LQC the Big Bang is replaced by a quantum bounce.

Study of LQC has led to many successes, including the emergence of a possible mechanism for cosmic inflation, resolution of gravitational singularities, as well as the development of effective semi-classical Hamiltonians.

This subfield originated in 1999 by Martin Bojowald, and further developed in particular by Abhay Ashtekar and Jerzy Lewandowski, as well as Tomasz Pawłowski and Parampreet Singh, et al. In late 2012 LQC represented a very active field in physics, with about three hundred papers on the subject published in the literature. There has also recently been work by Carlo Rovelli, et al. on relating LQC to spin foam cosmology.

However, the results obtained in LQC are subject to the usual restriction that a truncated classical theory, then quantized, might not display the true behaviour of the full theory due to artificial suppression of degrees of freedom that might have large quantum fluctuations in the full theory. It has been argued that singularity avoidance in LQC is by mechanisms only available in these restrictive models and that singularity avoidance in the full theory can still be obtained but by a more subtle feature of LQG.

== Big bounce in loop quantum cosmology ==
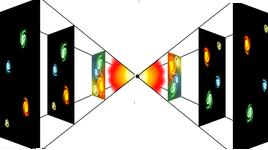
Illustration of big bounce universe

Due to the quantum geometry, the Big Bang is replaced by a big bounce without any assumptions on the matter content or any fine tuning. An important feature of loop quantum cosmology is the effective space-time description of the underlying quantum evolution. The effective dynamics approach has been extensively used in loop quantum cosmology to describe physics at the Planck scale and the very early universe. Rigorous numerical simulations have confirmed the validity of the effective dynamics, which provides an excellent approximation to the full loop quantum dynamics. It has been shown that only when the states have very large quantum fluctuations at late times, which means that they do not lead to macroscopic universes as described by general relativity, that the effective dynamics has departures from the quantum dynamics near bounce and the subsequent evolution. In such a case, the effective dynamics overestimates the density at the bounce, but still captures the qualitative aspects extremely well.

== Scale-invariant loop quantum cosmology ==
If the underlying spacetime geometry with matter has a scale invariance, which has been proposed to resolve the problem of time, Immirzi ambiguity and hierarchy problem of fundamental couplings, then the resulting loop quantum geometry has no definitive discrete gaps or a minimum size. Consequently, in scale-invariant LQC, the Big Bang is shown not to be replaced by a quantum bounce.

== See also ==
- Big Bounce – Model for the origin of the universe
- Loop quantum gravity – Theory of quantum gravity merging quantum mechanics and general relativity
- Cyclic model – Cosmological models involving indefinite, self-sustaining cycles
- Canonical quantum gravity
- Dilaton
