= Twisted geometries =

Discrete geometries used in spin foam models

Twisted geometries are discrete geometries that play a role in loop quantum gravity and spin foam models, where they appear in the semiclassical limit of spin networks. A twisted geometry can be visualized as collections of polyhedra dual to the nodes of the spin network's graph. Intrinsic and extrinsic curvatures are defined in a manner similar to Regge calculus, but with the generalisation of including a certain type of metric discontinuities: the face shared by two adjacent polyhedra has a unique area, but its shape can be different. This is a consequence of the quantum geometry of spin networks: ordinary Regge calculus is "too rigid" to account for all the geometric degrees of freedom described by the semiclassical limit of a spin network.

The name twisted geometry captures the relation between these additional degrees of freedom and the off-shell presence of torsion in the theory, but also the fact that this classical description can be derived from twistor theory, by assigning a pair of twistors to each link of the graph, and suitably constraining their helicities and incidence relations.
