= Cyclic model =

Cosmological models involving indefinite, self-sustaining cycles

A cyclic model (or oscillating model) is any of several cosmological models in which the universe follows infinite, or indefinite, self-sustaining cycles. For example, the oscillating universe theory briefly considered by Albert Einstein in 1930 theorized a universe following an eternal series of oscillations, each beginning with a Big Bang and ending with a Big Crunch; in the interim, the universe would expand for a period of time before the gravitational attraction of matter causes it to collapse back in and undergo a Big Bounce.

== Overview ==
In 1922, Alexander Friedmann introduced the Oscillating Universe Theory. However, work by Richard C. Tolman in 1934 showed that these early attempts failed because of the cyclic problem: according to the second law of thermodynamics, entropy can only increase. This implies that successive cycles grow longer and larger. Extrapolating back in time, cycles before the present one become shorter and smaller culminating again in a Big Bang and thus not replacing it. This puzzling situation remained for many decades until the early 21st century when the recently discovered dark energy component provided new hope for a consistent cyclic cosmology. In 2011, a five-year survey of 200,000 galaxies and spanning 7 billion years of cosmic time confirmed that "dark energy is driving our universe apart at accelerating speeds."

One new cyclic model is the brane cosmology model of the creation of the universe, derived from the earlier ekpyrotic model. It was proposed in 2001 by Paul Steinhardt of Princeton University and Neil Turok of Cambridge University. The theory describes a universe exploding into existence not just once, but repeatedly over time. The theory could potentially explain why a repulsive form of energy known as the cosmological constant, which is accelerating the expansion of the universe, is several orders of magnitude smaller than predicted by the standard Big Bang model.

A different cyclic model relying on the notion of phantom energy was proposed in 2007 by Lauris Baum and Paul Frampton of the University of North Carolina at Chapel Hill.

Other cyclic models include conformal cyclic cosmology and loop quantum cosmology.

Cyclic models regained attention by the mid 2020s, when tensions between the Lambda-CDM model predictions and DESI mapping observations regarding dynamic dark energy cast doubt on the final fate of the universe, leaving the possibility of a Big Bounce open.

== Steinhardt–Turok model ==
In this cyclic model, two parallel orbifold planes or M-branes collide periodically in a higher-dimensional space. The visible four-dimensional universe lies on one of these branes. The collisions correspond to a reversal from contraction to expansion, or a Big Crunch followed immediately by a Big Bang. The matter and radiation we see today were generated during the most recent collision in a pattern dictated by quantum fluctuations created before the branes. After billions of years the universe reached the state we observe today; after additional billions of years it will ultimately begin to contract again. Dark energy corresponds to a force between the branes, and serves the crucial role of solving the monopole, horizon, and flatness problems. Moreover, the cycles can continue indefinitely into the past and the future, and the solution is an attractor, so it can provide a complete history of the universe.

As Richard C. Tolman showed, the earlier cyclic model failed because the universe would undergo inevitable thermodynamic heat death. However, the newer cyclic model evades this by having a net expansion each cycle, preventing entropy from building up. However, there remain major open issues in the model. Foremost among them is that colliding branes are not understood by string theorists, and nobody knows if the scale invariant spectrum will be destroyed by the big crunch. Moreover, as with cosmic inflation, while the general character of the forces (in the ekpyrotic scenario, a force between branes) required to create the vacuum fluctuations is known, there is no candidate from particle physics.

== Baum–Frampton model ==
This more recent cyclic model of 2007 assumes an exotic form of dark energy called phantom energy, which possesses negative kinetic energy and would usually cause the universe to end in a Big Rip. This condition is achieved if the universe is dominated by dark energy with a cosmological equation of state parameter $w$ satisfying the condition $w\equiv \frac{p}{\rho} <-1$, for energy density ${\rho}$ and pressure p. By contrast, Steinhardt–Turok assume $w {\geq}-1$. In the Baum–Frampton model, a septillionth (or less) of a second (i.e. 10^{−24} seconds or less) before the would-be Big Rip, a turnaround occurs and only one causal patch is retained as our universe. The generic patch contains no quark, lepton or force carrier; only dark energy – and its entropy thereby vanishes. The adiabatic process of contraction of this much smaller universe takes place with constant vanishing entropy and with no matter including no black holes which disintegrated before turnaround.

The idea that the universe "comes back empty" is a central new idea of this cyclic model, and avoids many difficulties confronting matter in a contracting phase such as excessive structure formation, proliferation and expansion of black holes, as well as going through phase transitions such as those of QCD and electroweak symmetry restoration. Any of these would tend strongly to produce an unwanted premature bounce, simply to avoid violation of the second law of thermodynamics. The condition of $w <-1$ may be logically inevitable in a truly infinitely cyclic cosmology because of the entropy problem. Nevertheless, many technical back up calculations are necessary to confirm consistency of the approach. Although the model borrows ideas from string theory, it is not necessarily committed to strings, or to higher dimensions, yet such speculative devices may provide the most expeditious methods to investigate the internal consistency. The value of $w$ in the Baum–Frampton model can be made arbitrarily close to, but must be less than, −1.

== Other cyclic models ==
- Conformal cyclic cosmology—a general relativity based theory by Roger Penrose in which the universe expands until all the matter decays and is turned to light—so there is nothing in the universe that has any time or distance scale associated with it. This permits it to become identical with the Big Bang, so starting the next cycle.
- Loop quantum cosmology which predicts a "quantum bridge" between contracting and expanding cosmological branches.
- Nikolai Gorkavyi 'no dark matter and no dark energy' The oscillating Universe- Recent discoveries in observational astrophysics and cosmology have made it possible to exclude any exotic and hypothetical states of the Universe to explain the mechanism of fluctuations in its volume based on the works of Nikolai Gorkavyi. Based on the general theory of relativity, it is assumed that in each cycle, expansion begins due to the predominance of the antigravity force, which occurs as a result of a decrease in the mass of the system during the merger of black holes with the emission of gravitational waves (about 5% of the total mass is converted into energy), and compression occurs due to the predominance of the gravitational force, which increases as a result of the growth of the mass of black holes when they absorb gravitational waves. The proposed concept assumes, in particular, the existence at present of a giant black hole a billion light years in size, the maximum compression of the Universe in a cycle to a size of about a light year, the transition of some black holes from cycle to cycle.

== See also ==
Physical cosmologies:

- Big Bounce
- Conformal cyclic cosmology

Religion:

- Bhavacakra
- Cycles of time in Hinduism
- Eternal return
- Historic recurrence
- Jainism and non-creationism
- Kalachakra
- Wheel of time
