= Jan Ambjørn =

Danish physicist

Jan Ambjørn is a Danish theoretical physicist. He received his PhD in 1980 at the Niels Bohr Institute in Copenhagen, followed by postdoctoral research positions at Caltech and Nordita. He has been employed at the Niels Bohr Institute from 1986, since 1992 as professor in theoretical physics. From 2003 to 2010 he was also a professor at Utrecht University, and since 2012 he has been a professor at Radboud University, both in the Netherlands.

Ambjørn has worked on a large number of different topics. As a PhD student he worked together with his adviser P. Olesen on understanding the vacuum structure of QCD, using a model called the Copenhagen Vacuum. Later they developed the theory of magnetism in the electroweak theory. It provides a very simple physical realisation of anti-screening, an effect associated with asymptotically free quantum field theories.

Together with B. Durhuus and Jürg Fröhlich he proposed a non-perturbative formulation of the boson string theory, using what became known as dynamical triangulation. The formalism provides a successful description of so-called non-critical strings, which can also be viewed as two-dimensional quantum gravity coupled to matter with a central charge c<1. Using dynamical triangulation, he and Y. Watabiki calculated the so-called two-point function of pure two-dimensional quantum gravity (c=0), showing that the Hausdorff dimension of pure 2d gravity is 4.

Ambjørn used dynamical triangulation to provide a lattice regularization of three- and four-dimensional quantum gravity. The hope was that a four-dimensional quantum theory of gravity is asymptotically safe, with a non-perturbative UV fixed point, and that this fixed point could be found in the regularized lattice theory which then would provide a non-perturbative well-defined theory of quantum gravity. While there are calculations supporting the idea of an UV fixed point in quantum gravity, it has been difficult to find higher-order phase transition lines in the lattice theory where this fixed point can located.

Faced by the difficulties of finding second-order phase transitions in the four-dimensional lattice gravity theory based on dynamical triangulation, Ambjørn and Renate Loll suggested a modified lattice theory, now called causal dynamical triangulation. The name refers to the fact that the time direction on the lattice is treated differently from the spatial directions, by insisting that the (lattice) spacetimes which appear in the path integral have a time foliation. The model was first proposed in two-dimensional spacetime, where it could be solved analytically, and later generalized to three and four dimensions by Ambjørn, Loll and J. Jurkiewicz. The higher-dimensional models can be studied by computer simulations and second-order phase transition lines have been found. A UV fixed point can potentially by located on one of these lines.

As of 2022, Ambjørn has published 285 articles in refereed journals, 2 monographs and 70 proceeding contributions.
