= Ekpyrotic universe =

Cosmological model

The ekpyrotic universe (/ˌɛkpaɪˈrɒtɪk/) is a cosmological model of the early universe that explains the origin of the large-scale structure of the cosmos. The model has also been incorporated in the cyclic universe theory (or ekpyrotic cyclic universe theory), which proposes a complete cosmological history, both the past and future.

== Origins ==
The original ekpyrotic model was introduced by Justin Khoury, Burt Ovrut, Paul Steinhardt and Neil Turok in 2001.

Steinhardt created the name based on the Ancient Greek word ekpyrosis (ἐκπύρωσις, "conflagration"), which refers to a Stoic cosmological model in which the universe is caught in an eternal cycle of fiery birth, cooling and rebirth.

The theory addresses the fundamental question that remains unanswered by the Big Bang inflationary model, "What happened before the Big Bang?" The explanation, according to the ekpyrotic theory, is that the Big Bang was actually a Big Bounce, a transition from a previous epoch of contraction to the present epoch of expansion. The key events that shaped our universe occurred before the bounce, and, in a cyclic version, the universe bounces at regular intervals.

== Applications of the theory ==
Like Big Bang cosmology, the ekpyrotic theory has accurately described essential features of our universe. It predicts a uniform, flat universe with patterns of hot spots and cold spots, in agreement with observations of the cosmic microwave background (CMB), observations confirmed to higher precision by the WMAP and Planck satellite experiments. Observation of a CMB has long been considered evidence of the Big Bang, but proponents of the ekpyrotic and cyclic theories contend that the CMB is also consistent with a Big Bounce as posited in those models. Other researchers argue that data from the Planck observations of the CMB "significantly limit the viable parameter space of the ekpyrotic/cyclic scenarios."

== See also ==
- Cosmic inflation
- Cyclic model
- Physical cosmology
