= Quantum geometry =

Set of mathematical concepts in quantum gravity

In quantum gravity, quantum geometry is the set of mathematical concepts that generalize geometry to describe physical phenomena at distance scales comparable to the Planck length. Each theory of quantum gravity uses the term "quantum geometry" in a slightly different fashion.

String theory uses quantum geometry to describe exotic phenomena such as T-duality and other geometric dualities, mirror symmetry, topology-changing transitions, minimal possible distance scale, and other effects that challenge intuition. Generally, string theory is initially explored on a compact six-dimensional manifold to restrict the algebraic data needed for computation. By utilizing compactifications, string theory describes geometric states, where a compactification is a spacetime that looks four-dimensional macroscopically even if its actual dimension is higher. One goal in exploring string compactifications is to find vacuum solutions where the space is maximally symmetric.

When computing these vacuum solutions, preserving supersymmetry gives a first-order system of equations which can partially give the second-order equations of motion. This supersymmetry enables the use of differential geometry methods by using transition functions. Because the six-dimensional manifold cannot be covered with a single coordinate system, transition functions are grouped together into different G-structures. To define the G-structure, infinitesimal parameters for supersymmetry called spinors are introduced to enable stability during the transition. More technically, quantum geometry refers to the shape of a spacetime manifold as experienced by D-branes, which includes quantum corrections to the metric tensor, such as the worldsheet instantons. For example, the quantum volume of a cycle is computed from the mass of a brane wrapped on this cycle.

In an alternative approach to quantum gravity called loop quantum gravity (LQG), the phrase "quantum geometry" usually refers to the formalism within LQG where the observables that capture the information about the geometry are well-defined operators on a Hilbert space. In particular, certain operators, such as the area, have a discrete spectrum. LQG is non-commutative. It is possible (but considered unlikely) that this strictly quantized understanding of geometry is consistent with the quantum picture of geometry arising from string theory.

Another approach, which tries to reconstruct the geometry of space-time from "first principles" is Discrete Lorentzian quantum gravity.

== See also ==
- Noncommutative geometry
- Quantum spacetime
