= Alejandro Corichi =

Mexican physicist

Alejandro Corichi is a theoretical physicist working at the Quantum Gravity group of the National Autonomous University of Mexico (UNAM). He obtained his bachelor's degree at UNAM (1991) and his PhD at Pennsylvania State University (1997). His field of study is General Relativity and Quantum Gravity, where he has contributed to the understanding of classical aspects of black holes, to the non-commutativity and black holes within the approach known as Loop quantum gravity and to loop quantum cosmology.
