= Martin Bojowald =

German physicist

Martin Bojowald (born 18 February 1973 in Jülich) is a German physicist who now works on the faculty of the Penn State Physics Department, where he is a member of the Institute for Gravitation and the Cosmos. Prior to joining Penn State he spent several years at the Max Planck Institute for Gravitational Physics in Potsdam, Germany. He works on loop quantum gravity and physical cosmology and is credited with establishing the sub-field of loop quantum cosmology.

== Positions ==
- Presently: Professor of Physics, The Pennsylvania State University, Institute for Gravitation and the Cosmos
- January 2006 – June 2009: Assistant Professor of Physics, The Pennsylvania State University, Institute for Gravitation and the Cosmos
- September 2003 – December 2005: Junior Staff Scientist, Albert-Einstein-Institut
- September 2000 – August 2003: Postdoctoral Scholar, Center for Gravitational Physics and Geometry, The Pennsylvania State University

== Education ==
- June 2000 – PhD at RWTH Aachen in Germany (with distinction), supervisor: Prof. Hans A. Kastrup
- July 1998 – August 2000: Fellow of the DFG-Graduate College "Strong and electroweak interactions at high energies"
- June 1998 – Diploma, RWTH Aachen (with distinction), supervisor: Prof. Dr. Hans A. Kastrup
- April 1995 – June 1998: Fellow of the German Merit Foundation
- October 1993 – June 2000: RWTH Aachen

== Prizes and awards ==
- Faculty Scholar Medal in the Physical Sciences 2011, Penn State University
- Teaching Award 2009, Penn State Society of Physics Students
- NSF CAREER AWARD 2008: "Effective Descriptions in Cosmology"
- Xanthopoulos Prize 2007 of the International Society on General Relativity and Gravitation
- Selected for a portrait in Nature, January 2005
- First Award, Gravity Research Foundation Essay Competition, 2003

== See also ==
- List of loop quantum gravity researchers
- Big Bounce
- Abhay Ashtekar
