= Simplicial manifold =

In physics, the term simplicial manifold commonly refers to one of several loosely defined objects, commonly appearing in the study of Regge calculus. These objects combine attributes of a simplex with those of a manifold. There is no standard usage of this term in mathematics, and so the concept can refer to a triangulation in topology, or a piecewise linear manifold, or one of several different functors from either the category of sets or the category of simplicial sets to the category of manifolds.

== A manifold made out of simplices ==
A simplicial manifold is a simplicial complex for which the geometric realization is homeomorphic to a topological manifold. This is essentially the concept of a triangulation in topology. This can mean simply that a neighborhood of each vertex (i.e. the set of simplices that contain that point as a vertex) is homeomorphic to a n-dimensional ball.

== A simplicial object built from manifolds ==
A simplicial manifold is also a simplicial object in the category of manifolds. This is a special case of a simplicial space in which, for each n, the space of n-simplices is a manifold.

For example, if G is a Lie group, then the simplicial nerve of G has the manifold $G^n$ as its space of n-simplices. More generally, G can be a Lie groupoid.
