= Renate Loll =

German physicist

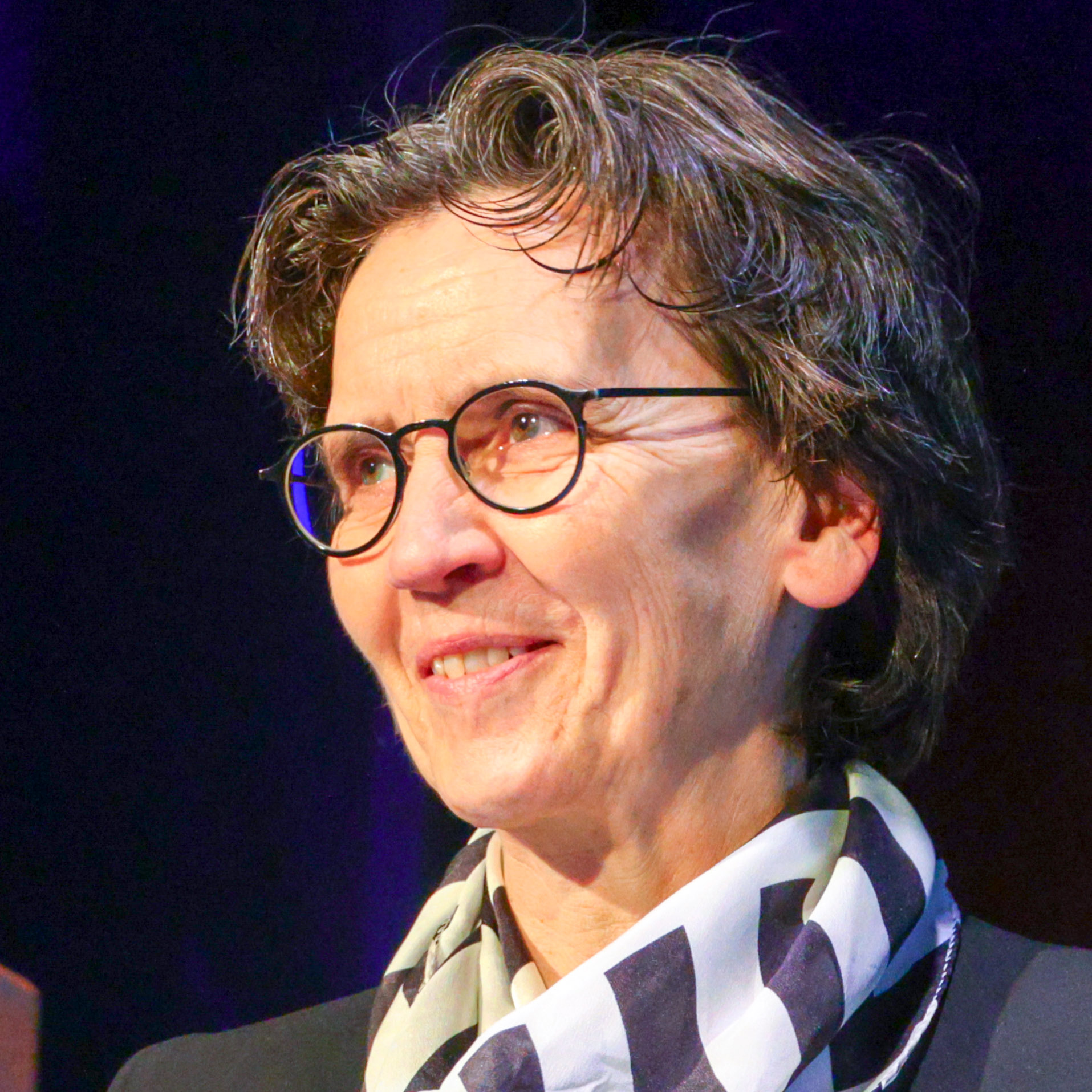
Renate Loll

Renate Loll (born 19 June 1962, Aachen) is a German physicist. She is a Professor in Theoretical Physics at the Institute for Mathematics, Astrophysics and Particle Physics of the Radboud University in Nijmegen, Netherlands. She previously worked at the Institute for Theoretical Physics of Utrecht University. She received her Ph.D. from Imperial College, London, in 1989. In 2001 she joined the permanent staff of the ITP, after spending several years at the Max Planck Institute for Gravitational Physics in Golm, Germany. With Jan Ambjørn and Polish physicist Jerzy Jurkiewicz she helped develop a new approach to nonperturbative quantization of gravity, that of Causal Dynamical Triangulations.

She has been a member of the Royal Netherlands Academy of Arts and Sciences since 2015.
