= John W. Barrett (physicist) =

Professor of mathematical physics at the University of Nottingham

John W. Barrett is professor of mathematical physics at the School of Mathematical Sciences of the University of Nottingham. He is a quantum gravity researcher who is known for the Barrett–Crane model of quantum gravity.
