= Rafael Sorkin =

American physicist (1945–2026)

Rafael Dolnick Sorkin
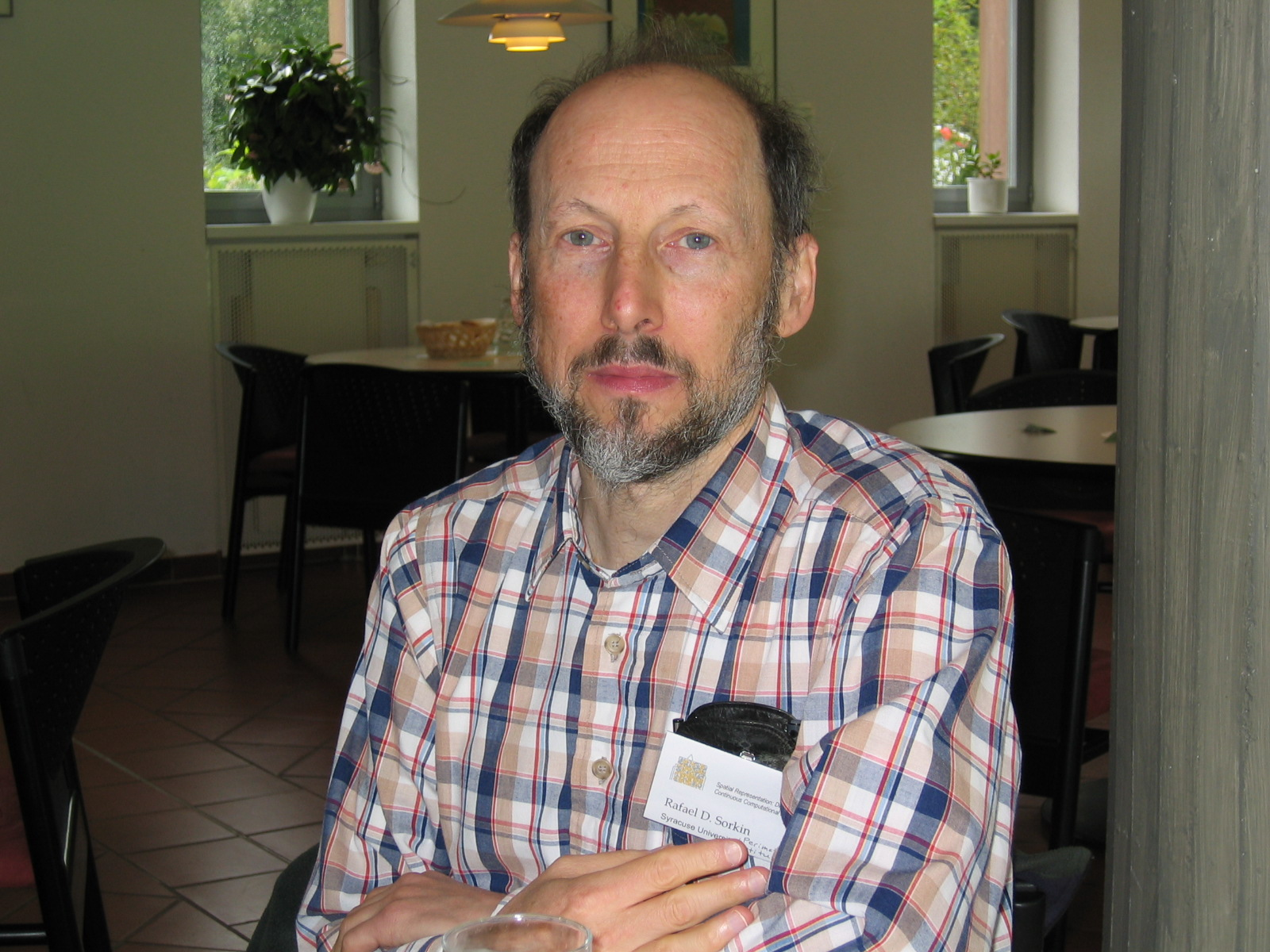
- Sorkin in 2004
- Born: 5 October 1945
- Died: 12 September 2026 (aged 80); Kitchener, Ontario, Canada
- Education: Harvard University (AB); California Institute of Technology (PhD)
- Known for: Causal sets Entropy of entanglement Sorkin parameter Sorkin-Johnston vacuum
- Scientific career
- Fields: Theoretical Physics
- Workplaces: Syracuse University, Perimeter Institute for Theoretical Physics
- Thesis: Development of Simplectic Methods for the Metrical and Electromagnetic Fields (1974)
- Doctoral advisor: James Gunn

Rafael Dolnick Sorkin (5 October 1945 – 12 September 2026) was an American physicist. He was professor emeritus of physics at Syracuse University and the Perimeter Institute for Theoretical Physics, and a Fellow of the American Physical Society. He was best known as the initiator and main proponent of the causal sets approach to quantum gravity. He was also known for introducing entanglement entropy as a source for black hole entropy.

== Background ==
Rafael Sorkin was born on 5 October 1945. He grew up in Chicago, Illinois, and was educated at the New Trier Township High School (valedictorian, 1963), Harvard University (A.B., Summa Cum Laude, Phi Beta Kappa, 1966), and California Institute of Technology (Ph.D., 1974). He was the son of the American violinist Leonard Sorkin.

Rafael Sorkin died in Kitchener, Ontario on 12 September 2026, at the age of 80.

== Research interests ==
Sorkin believed that the successful solution of quantum gravity will involve both a reevaluation of gravity in terms of a discrete structure underlying continuous spacetime, and also a reformulation of quantum mechanics. He also hypothesised that the phenomena of topology change and the thermodynamics of the black hole structure provide important clues to the formation of the final synthesis. In this framework he has examined the quantum properties of topological geons (particles created directly from the spacetime topology). His findings include that the topological geons can exhibit remarkable statistical properties. He also discovered evidence that topology change is a required feature of any consistent quantum gravity theory. He has hunted the origin of a black hole's entropy to discover more about how it relates to the synthesis of quantum mechanics and the theory of general relativity.

His work, along with Steven Johnston's, on quantum field theory on causal sets led to the construction of the Sorkin-Johnston vacuum, a distinguished vacuum state for the scalar field upon any spacetime background.

He also introduced anhomomorphic logic, a new interpretation of quantum theory. He recast quantum mechanics as part of a more general framework, quantum measure theory, wherein one may have higher order interference, leading to deviation from the Born rule. The higher order interference effects are quantified by what are now called the Sorkin parameters (with the singular Sorkin parameter referring to the next order interference beyond quantum mechanics).
