= Causal sets =

Approach to quantum gravity using discrete spacetime

The causal sets program is an approach to quantum gravity. Its founding principles are that spacetime is fundamentally discrete (a collection of discrete spacetime points, called the elements of the causal set) and that spacetime events are related by a partial order. This partial order has the physical meaning of the causality relations between spacetime events.

== History ==
Causality has always had a fundamental role in physics. Early attempts to use causality as a starting point were made by Hermann Weyl and Hendrik Lorentz. Alfred Robb in two books in 1914 and 1936 suggested an axiomatic framework where the causal precedence played a critical role. The first explicit proposal of quantizing the causal structure of spacetime is attributed by Sumati Surya to E. H. Kronheimer and Roger Penrose, who invented causal spaces in order to "admit structures which can be very different from a manifold". Causal spaces are defined axiomatically, by considering not only causal precedence, but also chronological precedence.

The program of causal sets is based on a theorem by David Malament, extending former results by Christopher Zeeman, and by Stephen Hawking, A. R. King and P. J. McCarthy. Malament's theorem states that if there is a bijective map between two past and future distinguishing space times that preserves their causal structure then the map is a conformal isomorphism. The conformal factor that is left undetermined is related to the volume of regions in the spacetime. This volume factor can be recovered by specifying a volume element for each space time point. The volume of a space time region could then be found by counting the number of points in that region.

Causal sets was initiated by Rafael Sorkin who continued to be the main proponent of the program. He has coined the slogan "Order + Number = Geometry" to characterize the above argument. The program provides a theory in which space time is fundamentally discrete while retaining local Lorentz invariance.

== Definition ==
A causal set (or causet) is a set $C$ with a partial order relation $\preceq$ that is

- Reflexive: For all $x \in C$, we have $x \preceq x$.
- Antisymmetric: For all $x, y \in C$, we have $x \preceq y$ and $y \preceq x$ implies $x = y$.
- Transitive: For all $x, y, z \in C$, we have $x \preceq y$ and $y \preceq z$ implies $x \preceq z$.
- Locally finite: For all $x, z \in C$, we have $\{y \in C | x \preceq y \preceq z\}$ is a finite set.

We'll write $x \prec y$ if $x \preceq y$ and $x \neq y$.

The set $C$ represents the set of spacetime events and the order relation $\preceq$ represents the causal relationship between events (see causal structure for the analogous idea in a Lorentzian manifold).

Although this definition uses the reflexive convention we could have chosen the irreflexive convention in which the order relation is irreflexive and asymmetric.

The causal relation of a Lorentzian manifold (without closed causal curves) satisfies the first three conditions. It is the local finiteness condition that introduces spacetime discreteness.

== Comparison to the continuum ==
Given a causal set we may ask whether it can be embedded into a Lorentzian manifold. An embedding would be a map taking elements of the causal set into points in the manifold such that the order relation of the causal set matches the causal ordering of the manifold. A further criterion is needed however before the embedding is suitable. If, on average, the number of causal set elements mapped into a region of the manifold is proportional to the volume of the region then the embedding is said to be faithful. In this case we can consider the causal set to be 'manifold-like'.

A central conjecture of the causal set program, called the Hauptvermutung ('fundamental conjecture'), is that the same causal set cannot be faithfully embedded into two spacetimes that are not similar on large scales.

It is difficult to define this conjecture precisely because it is difficult to decide when two spacetimes are 'similar on large scales'. Modelling spacetime as a causal set would require us to restrict attention to those causal sets that are 'manifold-like'. Given a causal set this is a difficult property to determine.

=== Sprinkling ===
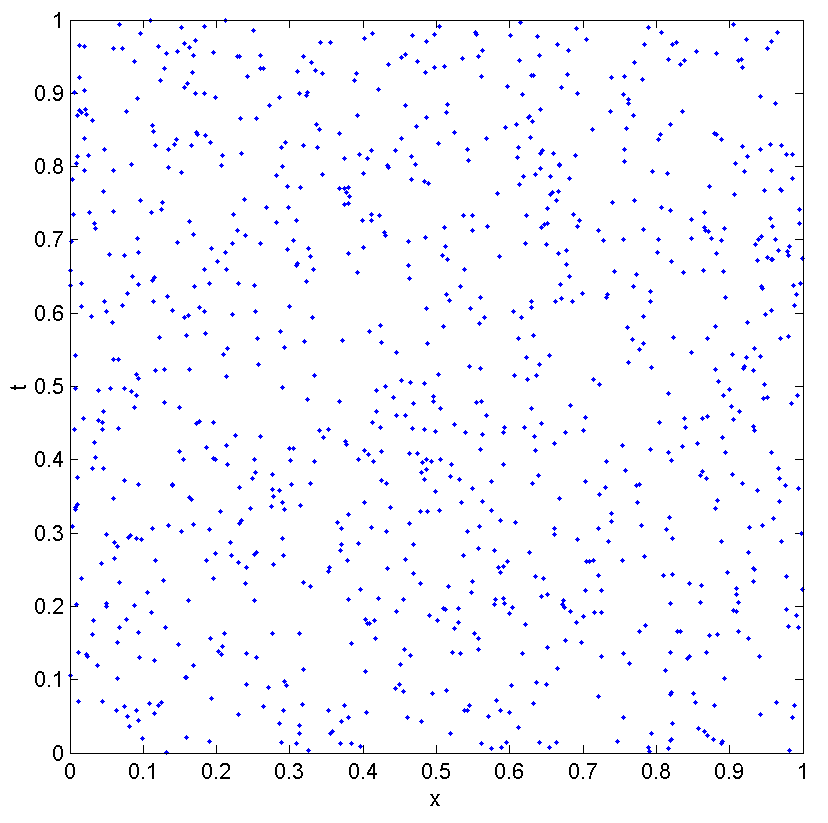
A plot of 1000 sprinkled points in 1+1 dimensions

The difficulty of determining whether a causal set can be embedded into a manifold can be approached from the other direction. We can create a causal set by sprinkling points into a Lorentzian manifold. By sprinkling points in proportion to the volume of the spacetime regions and using the causal order relations in the manifold to induce order relations between the sprinkled points, we can produce a causal set that (by construction) can be faithfully embedded into the manifold.

To maintain Lorentz invariance this sprinkling of points must be done randomly using a Poisson process. Thus the probability of sprinkling $n$ points into a region of volume $V$ is

$P(n) = \frac{(\rho V)^n e^{-\rho V}}{n!}$

where $\rho$ is the density of the sprinkling.

Sprinkling points as a regular lattice would not keep the number of points proportional to the region volume.

== Geometry ==
Some geometrical constructions in manifolds carry over to causal sets. When defining these we must remember to rely only on the causal set itself, not on any background spacetime into which it might be embedded. For an overview of these constructions, see.

=== Geodesics ===
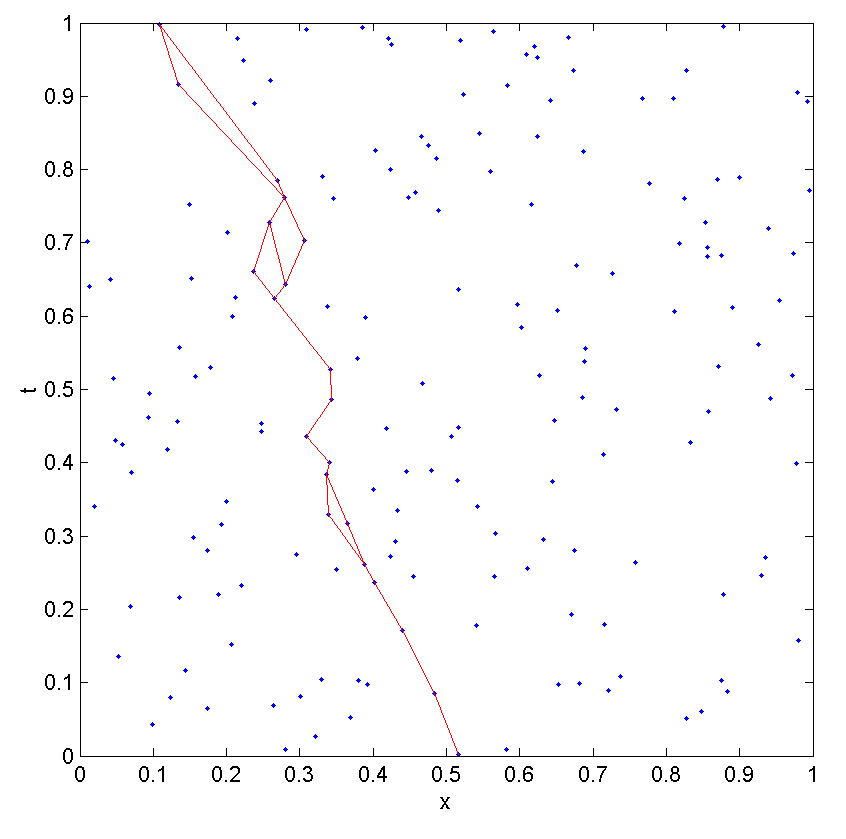
A plot of geodesics between two points in a 180-point causal set made by sprinkling into 1+1 dimensions

A link in a causal set is a pair of elements $x, y \in C$ such that $x \prec y$ but with no $z \in C$ such that $x \prec z \prec y$.

A chain is a sequence of elements $x_0,x_1,\ldots,x_n$ such that $x_i \prec x_{i+1}$ for $i=0,\ldots,n-1$. The length of a chain is $n$. If every $x_i, x_{i+1}$ in the chain form a link, then the chain is called a path.

We can use this to define the notion of a geodesic between two causal set elements, provided they are order comparable, that is, causally connected (physically, this means they are time-like). A geodesic between two elements $x \preceq y \in C$ is a chain consisting only of links such that

1. $x_0 = x$ and $x_n = y$
2. The length of the chain, $n$, is maximal over all chains from $x$ to $y$.

In general there can be more than one geodesic between two comparable elements.

Myrheim first suggested that the length of such a geodesic should be directly proportional to the proper time along a timelike geodesic joining the two spacetime points. Tests of this conjecture have been made using causal sets generated from sprinklings into flat spacetimes. The proportionality has been shown to hold and is conjectured to hold for sprinklings in curved spacetimes too.

=== Dimension estimators ===
Much work has been done in estimating the manifold dimension of a causal set. This involves algorithms using the causal set aiming to give the dimension of the manifold into which it can be faithfully embedded. The algorithms developed so far are based on finding the dimension of a Minkowski spacetime into which the causal set can be faithfully embedded.

- Myrheim–Meyer dimension

This approach relies on estimating the number of $k$-length chains present in a sprinkling into $d$-dimensional Minkowski spacetime. Counting the number of $k$-length chains in the causal set then allows an estimate for $d$ to be made.

- Midpoint-scaling dimension

This approach relies on the relationship between the proper time between two points in Minkowski spacetime and the volume of the spacetime interval between them. By computing the maximal chain length (to estimate the proper time) between two points $x$ and $y$ and counting the number of elements $z$ such that $x \prec z \prec y$ (to estimate the volume of the spacetime interval) the dimension of the spacetime can be calculated.

These estimators should give the correct dimension for causal sets generated by high-density sprinklings into $d$-dimensional Minkowski spacetime. Tests in conformally-flat spacetimes have shown these two methods to be accurate.

== Dynamics ==
An ongoing task is to develop the correct dynamics for causal sets. These would provide a set of rules that determine which causal sets correspond to physically realistic spacetimes. The most popular approach to developing causal set dynamics is based on the sum-over-histories version of quantum mechanics. This approach would perform a sum-over-causal sets by growing a causal set one element at a time. Elements would be added according to quantum mechanical rules and interference would ensure a large manifold-like spacetime would dominate the contributions. The best model for dynamics at the moment is a classical model in which elements are added according to probabilities. This model, due to David Rideout and Rafael Sorkin, is known as classical sequential growth (CSG) dynamics. The classical sequential growth model is a way to generate causal sets by adding new elements one after another. Rules for how new elements are added are specified and, depending on the parameters in the model, different causal sets result.

In analogy to the path integral formulation of quantum mechanics, one approach to developing a quantum dynamics for causal sets has been to apply an action principle in the sum-over-causal sets approach. Sorkin has proposed a discrete analogue for the d'Alembertian, which can in turn be used to define the Ricci curvature scalar and thereby the Benincasa–Dowker action on a causal set. Monte-Carlo simulations have provided evidence for a continuum phase in 2D using the Benincasa–Dowker action.

== See also ==
- Causal dynamical triangulation (CDT)
- Causal structure
- General relativity
- Order theory
