= Euclidean quantum gravity =

Approach to quantum gravity utilizing Wick rotations

In theoretical physics, Euclidean quantum gravity exploits the Wick rotation to describe gravity according to the principles of quantum mechanics. This particular approach to quantum gravity is an outgrowth of research on the thermodynamics of black holes by Stephen Hawking and James Hartle.

== Introduction in layperson's terms ==
=== The Wick rotation ===
In physics, a Wick rotation, named after Gian-Carlo Wick, is a method of finding a solution to dynamics problems in $n$ dimensions, by transposing their descriptions in $n + 1$, by trading one dimension of space for one dimension of time. More precisely, it substitutes a mathematical problem in Minkowski space into a related problem in Euclidean space by means of a transformation that substitutes an imaginary-number variable for a real-number variable.

It is called a rotation because when complex numbers are represented as a plane, the multiplication of a complex number by $i$ is equivalent to rotating the vector representing that number by an angle of $\pi/2$ radians about the origin.

For example, a Wick rotation could be used to relate a macroscopic event temperature diffusion (like in a bath) to the underlying thermal movements of molecules. If we attempt to model the bath volume with the different gradients of temperature we would have to subdivide this volume into infinitesimal volumes and see how they interact. We know such infinitesimal volumes are in fact water molecules. If we represent all molecules in the bath by only one molecule in an attempt to simplify the problem, this unique molecule should walk along all possible paths that the real molecules might follow. The path integral formulation is the conceptual tool used to describe the movements of this unique molecule, and Wick rotation is one of the mathematical tools that are very useful to analyse a path integral problem.

=== Application in quantum mechanics ===
In a somewhat similar manner, the motion of a quantum object as described by quantum mechanics implies that it can exist simultaneously in different positions and have different speeds. It differs clearly to the movement of a classical object (e.g. a billiard ball) for which a single path with precise position and speed can be described. A quantum object does not move from A to B with a single path, but moves from A to B by all ways possible at the same time. According to the Feynman path-integral formulation of quantum mechanics, the path of the quantum object is described mathematically as a weighted average of all those possible paths. In 1966 an explicitly gauge invariant functional-integral algorithm was found by DeWitt, which extended Feynman's new rules to all orders. What is appealing in this new approach is its lack of singularities when they are unavoidable in general relativity.

Another operational problem with general relativity is the computational difficulty, because of the complexity of the mathematical tools used. Path integrals in contrast have been used in mechanics since the end of the nineteenth century and are well known. In addition, the path-integral formalism is used both in classical and quantum physics so it might be a good starting point for unifying general relativity and quantum theories. For example, the quantum-mechanical Schrödinger equation and the classical heat equation are related by Wick rotation. So the Wick relation is a good tool to relate a classical phenomenon to a quantum phenomenon. The ambition of Euclidean quantum gravity is to use the Wick rotation to find connections between a macroscopic phenomenon, gravity, and something more microscopic.

== More rigorous treatment ==
Euclidean quantum gravity refers to a Wick rotated version of quantum gravity, formulated as a quantum field theory. The manifolds that are used in this formulation are 4-dimensional Riemannian manifolds instead of pseudo Riemannian manifolds. It is also assumed that the manifolds are compact, connected and boundaryless (i.e. no singularities). Following the usual quantum field-theoretic formulation, the vacuum to vacuum amplitude is written as a functional integral over the metric tensor, which is now the quantum field under consideration.

$$\int \mathcal{D}\mathbf{g}\, \mathcal{D}\phi\, \exp\left(\int d^4x \sqrt{|\mathbf{g}|}(R+\mathcal{L}_\mathrm{matter})\right)$$

where φ denotes all the matter fields. See Einstein–Hilbert action.

== Relation to ADM formalism ==
Euclidean Quantum Gravity does relate back to ADM formalism used in canonical quantum gravity and recovers the Wheeler–DeWitt equation under various circumstances. If we have some matter field $\phi$, then the path integral reads

$$Z = \int \mathcal{D}\mathbf{g}\, \mathcal{D}\phi\, \exp\left(\int d^4x \sqrt{|\mathbf{g}|}(R+\mathcal{L}_\mathrm{matter})\right)$$

where integration over $\mathcal{D}\mathbf{g}$ includes an integration over the three-metric, the lapse function $N$, and shift vector $N^{a}$. But we demand that $Z$ be independent of the lapse function and shift vector at the boundaries, so we obtain

$$\frac{\delta Z}{\delta N}=0=\int \mathcal{D}\mathbf{g}\, \mathcal{D}\phi\, \left.\frac{\delta S}{\delta N}\right|_{\Sigma} \exp\left(\int d^4x \sqrt{|\mathbf{g}|}(R+\mathcal{L}_\mathrm{matter})\right)$$

where $\Sigma$ is the three-dimensional boundary. Observe that this expression vanishes implies the functional derivative vanishes, giving us the Wheeler–DeWitt equation. A similar statement may be made for the diffeomorphism constraint (take functional derivative with respect to the shift functions instead).
