= Creation Node =

2023 novel by Stephen Baxter

- First edition cover
- Author: Stephen Baxter
- Language: English
- Genre: Science fiction
- Publisher: Victor Gollancz Ltd
- Publication date: 21 September 2023
- Publication place: United Kingdom
- Media type: Hard cover
- Pages: 442
- ISBN: 978-1-4732-2895-5

Creation Node is a 2023 science fiction novel by British writer Stephen Baxter, first published in September 2023 in the United Kingdom by Victor Gollancz Ltd. The book is about the discovery of the hypothesised Planet Nine in the Oort cloud at the outer edge of the Solar System. Initially it is thought to be a black hole, but it is later revealed to be an artificial planet.

== Background ==
Baxter said in an interview that the idea for Creation Node came from a book by SETI pioneer Carl Sagan in which Sagan suggested that if the universe has always existed and new stars are continually being created, there should be regions in space that are infinitely old. This led Baxter to ponder "what kind of creatures might live in such a place, and what they might want ..."

Baxter wrote in the "Afterword" of Creation Node that some of the ideas he used in the novel came from several sources, including:

- Project Daedalus, a 1970s study conducted by the British Interplanetary Society into the use of a fusion drive in an interstellar probe
- Scholtz, J.; Unwin, J. (2020). "What if Planet 9 is a Primordial Black Hole?". Physical Review Letters. 125 (5) 051103. arXiv:1909.11090. Bibcode:2020PhRvL.125e1103S. doi:10.1103/PhysRevLett.125.051103. ISSN 1092-0145. PMID 32794880.
- Hertog, Thomas (2023). On the Origin of Time (1st ed.). Penguin. ISBN 978-1-911709-08-4. – includes an exploration of Stephen Hawking's theories on black holes and the multiverse
- Carr, Bernard (1 April 2023). "Black holes from a Previous Universe". New Scientist. 257 (3432): 46–49. Bibcode:2023NewSc.257...46C. doi:10.1016/S0262-4079(23)00581-X. ISSN 0262-4079. ProQuest 2841826695.

== Plot summary ==
Creation Node begins in 2255 when Earth has recovered from a series of climatic and ecological disasters. Humanity has split into three socio-political alliances, the Lunar Consortium who mine whatever resources they can find on the Moon and elsewhere, the Earth-based Conservers who prohibit the use of non-renewable resources, and the Earth World Government. A group of Conservers have discovered the hypothesised Planet Nine in the Oort cloud at the outer edge of the Solar System, four light-days from Earth. They left Earth 35 years ago in their solar powered craft, Shadow, and have found that Planet Nine appears to be a primordial black hole that is emitting Hawking radiation. Furthermore, the crew of Shadow discover that the radiation has structure, suggesting it may be a message. When they reflect the "message" back, the black hole changes into an Earth-like, but featureless quasi-planet. Two of the crew land on the "planet" to investigate and find a sentient feathered humanoid alien they name "Feathers".

Feathers is taken aboard Shadow, and the crew wonders whether it has a message for them. But attempts to communicate with it prove fruitless, leading to speculation that Feathers itself may be a message. When news of Shadow's discovery reaches Earth, there is a scramble to get to Planet Nine. The World Government dispatches Cronus, a fission powered space liner with representatives from Earth, the Conservers, and the Lunar Consortium. To speed up the trip to Planet Nine, Cronus first travels to a space habitat in orbit around Saturn to get a fusion drive fitted. The drive is powered by helium-3, which is mined in Saturn's atmosphere via a space elevator attached to the habitat. (Note: Powered by a fission drive, Cronus takes six years to get from Earth to Saturn (nine AU). After the upgrade to a fusion drive, it takes five years to get to Planet Nine in the Oort cloud (seven hundred AU).)

Cronus arrives at Planet Nine. Two crew members from Cronus and two from Shadow, plus Feathers land on the "planet". A portal opens and the landing party find themselves on a real planet under a different sky. It turns out to be Feathers' home planet, but far in the future. A god-like entity, Terminus appears in the form of a floating sphere and explains to the visitors that they are in another universe, one of many in the multiverse. Terminus tells them of a plan to transform humanity's galaxy into a "creation node", from which an eternal cosmos would grow, one that would continually regenerate itself and never grow old and die. But Terminus cautions that the price for eternity is that their galaxy would have to be reset, destroying all life in it.

== Critical reception ==
In a review of Creation Node in Locus magazine, Russell Letson described the novel as "a sprawling, multiviewpoint, multithreaded story that eventually knits together its strands". He wrote that the book's future-political disputes brings to mind writers like Robert Heinlein and Alfred Bester, while its cosmos-wide elements pay homage to the classic epics by Olaf Stapledon and Arthur C. Clarke. Letson found the cosmic scenarios and their philosophical ramifications "strong stuff", and was captivated by the characters' reactions to the mysteries they encountered. But he felt that the physics and technical explanations a little excessive at times and wondered whether some of it should have been included in an appendix.

In another review in Locus, American science fiction writer Paul Di Filippo called Creation Node "mind-blowing" and "truly satisfying". He said the book is split into two sections, the traditional "Ben Bova-like Solar System expeditions", followed by the "far out" multidimensional "Clarkean" epic. Di Filippo stated that the last part is so "radically different" from the "realpolitik stuff" of the first, that the "mental and physical disjunctions might wreak havoc with the reader". He added that it is in this last part that "Baxter kicks out all the jams [and] weaves a cosmological-metaphysical-existential tapestry that is unique and sure to shock."

In a review in the British Science Fiction Association journal, The BSFA Review, Stuart Carter called Creation Node "classic Baxter". He said it has all the elements of "cosmic horror" and humanity's insignificance in the universe's grand scheme of things. Carter suggested that while Baxter may not be the "strongest" science fiction writer, "his willingness to face head-on the reality of our universe puts him at the head of a very British tradition of simultaneous wonder and humility."

Mark Yon wrote in a review of Creation Node in SFFWorld that Baxter, known for his "big ideas" in science fiction, has produced one of his "biggest, most audacious plot[s] to date". Yon was a little critical of the middle sections of the book where he felt "everything slows down" and the excitement of the initial discovery of Planet Nine dissipates. But once Baxter starts to develop his "big ideas" in the last section, Yon "appreciated the hugeness of it all". He stated that the book grew on him, and "there's a lot to like" in it.

== Works cited ==
- Baxter, Stephen (2023). Creation Node. Victor Gollancz Ltd. ISBN 978-1-4732-2895-5.
