= Thomas Hertog =

Belgian cosmologist (b. 1975)

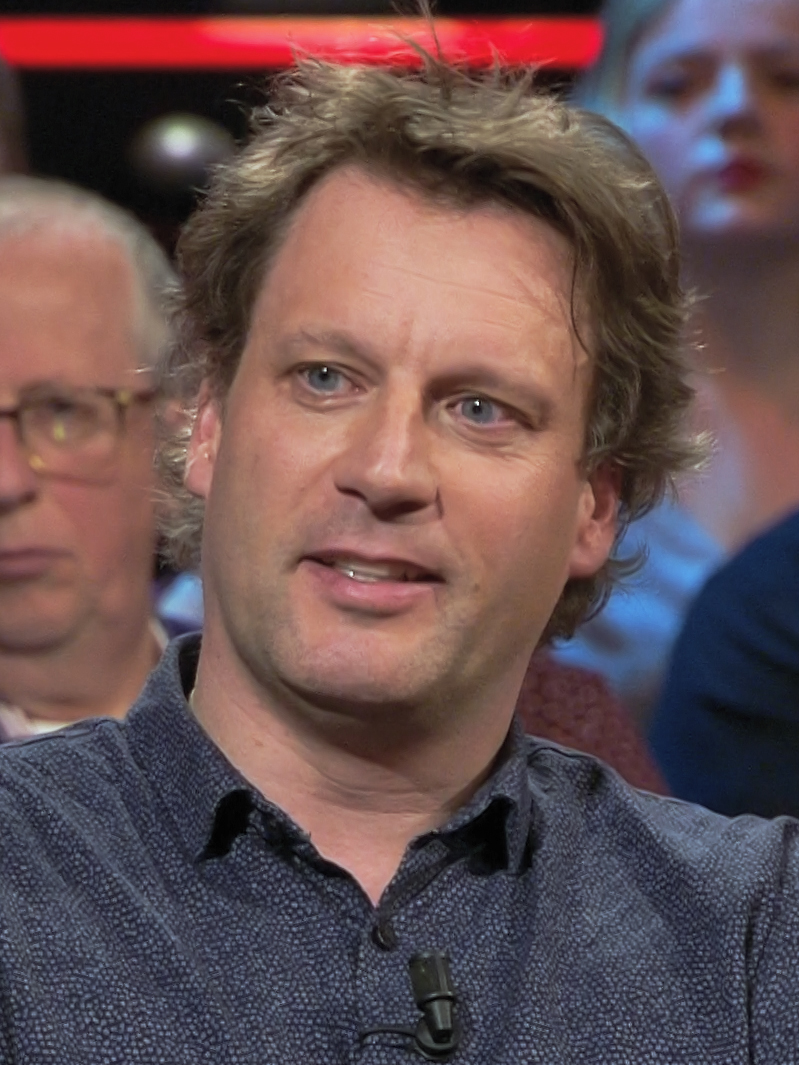
- Hertog in 2018
- Born: 27 May 1975 (age 51)
- Education: KU Leuven
- Known for: On the Origin of Time
- Scientific career
- Fields: Physics
- Workplaces: University of Cambridge; University of California, Santa Barbara; KU Leuven
- Thesis: On the origins of cosmic expansion (2001)
- Doctoral advisor: Stephen Hawking
- Website: https://www.kuleuven.be/wieiswie/en/person/00010845

Thomas Hertog is a Belgian cosmologist at KU Leuven university and was a key collaborator of Professor Stephen Hawking.

== Early life ==
Thomas Hertog was born on 27 May 1975. He graduated Summa cum laude from KU Leuven in 1997 with an MSc degree in physics. He obtained his Master's degree at the University of Cambridge in Part III of the Mathematical Tripos and obtained a Ph.D. degree at Cambridge with a thesis on the origins of cosmic expansion under the supervision of Stephen Hawking.

== Career ==
Hertog had the opportunity to conduct research with Stephen Hawking in the field of cosmic inflation, a branch of the Big Bang theory.

He then worked as a researcher at the University of California - Santa Barbara in the United States and the Université de Paris VII in France. He became a fellow at CERN in Geneva in 2005. In October 2011, Hertog was appointed professor at the Institute for Theoretical Physics at KU Leuven through the Odysseus program of the Flemish government. He leads a research group studying the relationship between the Big Bang and string theory, with the idea that concepts like space and time lose their meaning. He also emphasizes Georges Lemaître's insight that the Big Bang is central to Einstein's gravitational waves. Hertog worked in the field of quantum cosmology and string theory with James Hartle and Stephen Hawking. In 2011, after years of research, they came to a new insight by combining the mathematics of quantum cosmology and that of string theory. In 2018, he published 'A smooth exit from eternal inflation?' with Stephen Hawking.

Hertog was an important contributor to the development of top-down cosmology. He explains the theory in his 2023 book On the Origin of Time, which Hawking asked him to write just before his death.

== Selected publications ==
=== Books ===
- Hertog, Thomas; Baert, Barbara; Van de Stock, Jan (2021). Big Bang: Imagining the Universe. Translated by Simpson, Helen; Logan, Sandy. Hannibal Books. ISBN 978-94-63887-87-8.
- Hertog, Thomas (2023). On the Origin of Time: Stephen Hawking's Final Theory. Random House. ISBN 978-0-593-12844-2.

=== Journal articles ===
- Binétruy, P.; Bohé, A.; Hertog, T.; Steer, D. A. (9 December 2009). "Gravitational wave bursts from cosmic superstrings with Y-junctions". Physical Review D. 80 (12) 123510. American Physical Society (APS). arXiv:0907.4522. Bibcode:2009PhRvD..80l3510B. doi:10.1103/physrevd.80.123510. ISSN 1550-7998. S2CID 7271201.
- Hertog, Thomas; Horowitz, Gary T (30 July 2004). "Towards a Big Crunch Dual". Journal of High Energy Physics. 2004 (7). Springer Science and Business Media LLC: 073. arXiv:hep-th/0406134. Bibcode:2004JHEP...07..073H. doi:10.1088/1126-6708/2004/07/073. ISSN 1029-8479. S2CID 16255740.
- Hawking, S. W.; Hertog, T.; Reall, H. S. (29 June 2000). "Brane new world". Physical Review D. 62 (4) 043501. American Physical Society (APS). arXiv:hep-th/0003052. Bibcode:2000PhRvD..62d3501H. doi:10.1103/physrevd.62.043501. ISSN 0556-2821. S2CID 7180487.
- Hawking, S. W.; Hertog, Thomas (2018). "A smooth exit from eternal inflation?". Journal of High Energy Physics. 2018 (4). Springer Science and Business Media LLC: 147. arXiv:1707.07702. Bibcode:2018JHEP...04..147H. doi:10.1007/jhep04(2018)147. ISSN 1029-8479. S2CID 13745992.

== See also ==
- On the Origin of Time
- Christophe Galfard
