= Wheeler–DeWitt equation =

Field equation from quantum gravity

The Wheeler–DeWitt equation for theoretical physics and applied mathematics, is a field equation attributed to John Archibald Wheeler and Bryce DeWitt. The equation attempts to mathematically combine the ideas of quantum mechanics and general relativity, a step towards a theory of quantum gravity.

In this approach, time plays a role different from what it does in non-relativistic quantum mechanics, leading to the so-called "problem of time". More specifically, the equation describes the quantum version of the Hamiltonian constraint using metric variables. Its commutation relations with the diffeomorphism constraints generate the Bergman–Komar "group" (which is the diffeomorphism group on-shell).

== Motivation and background ==
In canonical gravity, spacetime is foliated into spacelike submanifolds. The three-metric (i.e., metric on the hypersurface) is $\gamma_{ij}$ and given by
$$g_{\mu\nu}\,\mathrm{d}x^{\mu}\,\mathrm{d}x^\nu = (-N^2 + \beta_k\beta^k)\,\mathrm{d}t^2 + 2\beta_k\,\mathrm{d}x^k\,\mathrm{d}t + \gamma_{ij}\,\mathrm{d}x^i\,\mathrm{d}x^j.$$
In that equation the Latin indices run over the values 1, 2, 3, and the Greek indices run over the values 1, 2, 3, 4. The three-metric $\gamma_{ij}$ is the field, and its conjugate momenta are denoted as $\pi^{ij}$. The Hamiltonian is a constraint (characteristic of most relativistic systems)
$$\mathcal{H} = \frac{1}{2\sqrt{\gamma}} G_{ijkl}\pi^{ij}\pi^{kl} - \sqrt{\gamma}\,{}^{(3)}\!R = 0,$$
where $\gamma = \det(\gamma_{ij})$, and $G_{ijkl} = (\gamma_{ik}\gamma_{jl} + \gamma_{il}\gamma_{jk} - \gamma_{ij}\gamma_{kl})$ is the Wheeler–DeWitt metric. In index-free notation, the Wheeler–DeWitt metric on the space of positive definite quadratic forms g in three dimensions is
$$\operatorname{tr}((g^{-1}dg)^2) - (\operatorname{tr}(g^{-1}dg))^2.$$

Quantization "puts hats" on the momenta and field variables; that is, the functions of numbers in the classical case become operators that modify the state function in the quantum case. Thus the operator
$$\hat{\mathcal{H}} = \frac{1}{2\sqrt{\gamma}} \hat{G}_{ijkl} \hat{\pi}^{ij} \hat{\pi}^{kl} - \sqrt{\gamma}\,{}^{(3)}\!\hat{R}.$$
is obtained.

Working in "position space", these operators are
$$\begin{align}
\hat{\gamma}_{ij}(t, x^k) &\to \gamma_{ij}(t, x^k), \\
\hat{\pi}^{ij}(t,x^k) &\to -i \frac{\delta}{\delta \gamma_{ij}(t,x^k)}.
\end{align}$$

One can apply the operator to a general wave functional of the metric $\hat{\mathcal{H}} \Psi[\gamma] = 0,$ where
$$\Psi[\gamma] = a + \int \psi(x)\gamma(x) \,dx^3 + \iint \psi(x, y)\gamma(x)\gamma(y) \,dx^3 \,dy^3 + \dots,$$
which would give a set of constraints amongst the coefficients $\psi(x, y, \dots)$. This means that the amplitudes for $N$ gravitons at certain positions are related to the amplitudes for a different number of gravitons at different positions. Or, one could use the two-field formalism, treating $\omega(g)$ as an independent field, so that the wave function is $\Psi[\gamma, \omega]$.

== Mathematical formalism ==
The Wheeler–DeWitt equation is a functional differential equation. It is ill-defined in the general case, but very important in theoretical physics, especially in quantum gravity. It is a functional differential equation on the space of three-dimensional spatial metrics. The Wheeler–DeWitt equation has the form of an operator acting on a wave functional; the functional reduces to a function in cosmology. Contrary to the general case, the Wheeler–DeWitt equation is well defined in minisuperspaces like the configuration space of cosmological theories. An example of such a wave function is the Hartle–Hawking state. Bryce DeWitt first published this equation in 1967 under the name "Einstein–Schrödinger equation"; it was later renamed the "Wheeler–DeWitt equation".

=== Hamiltonian constraint ===
Simply speaking, the Wheeler–DeWitt equation says

$\hat{H}(x) |\psi\rangle = 0,$

where $\hat{H}(x)$ is the Hamiltonian constraint in quantized general relativity, and $|\psi\rangle$ stands for the wave function of the universe. Unlike ordinary quantum field theory or quantum mechanics, the Hamiltonian is a first-class constraint on physical states. We also have an independent constraint for each point in space.

Although the symbols $\hat{H}$ and $|\psi\rangle$ may appear familiar, their interpretation in the Wheeler–DeWitt equation is substantially different from non-relativistic quantum mechanics. $|\psi\rangle$ is no longer a spatial wave function in the traditional sense of a complex-valued function that is defined on a 3-dimensional space-like surface and normalized to unity. Instead it is a functional of field configurations on all of spacetime. This wave function contains all of the information about the geometry and matter content of the universe. $\hat{H}$ is still an operator that acts on the Hilbert space of wave functions, but it is not the same Hilbert space as in the nonrelativistic case, and the Hamiltonian no longer determines the evolution of the system, so the Schrödinger equation $\hat{H} |\psi\rangle = i \hbar \partial / \partial t |\psi\rangle$ no longer applies. This property is known as timelessness. Various attempts to incorporate time in a fully quantum framework have been made, starting with the "Page and Wootters mechanism" and other subsequent proposals. The reemergence of time was also proposed as arising from quantum correlations between an evolving system and a reference quantum clock system, the concept of system-time entanglement is introduced as a quantifier of the actual distinguishable evolution undergone by the system.

=== Momentum constraint ===
We also need to augment the Hamiltonian constraint with momentum constraints

$$\vec{\mathcal{P}}(x) |\psi\rangle = 0$$

associated with spatial diffeomorphism invariance.

In minisuperspace approximations, we only have one Hamiltonian constraint (instead of infinitely many of them).

In fact, the principle of general covariance in general relativity implies that global evolution per se does not exist; the time $t$ is just a label we assign to one of the coordinate axes. Thus, what we think about as time evolution of any physical system is just a gauge transformation, similar to that of QED induced by U(1) local gauge transformation $\psi \to e^{i\theta(\vec{r})} \psi,$ where $\theta(\vec{r})$ plays the role of local time. The role of a Hamiltonian is simply to restrict the space of the "kinematic" states of the Universe to that of "physical" states—the ones that follow gauge orbits. For this reason we call it a "Hamiltonian constraint". Upon quantization, physical states become wave functions that lie in the kernel of the Hamiltonian operator.

In general, the Hamiltonian vanishes for a theory with general covariance or time-scaling invariance.

== See also ==
- ADM formalism
- Canonical quantum gravity
- Diffeomorphism constraint
- Euclidean quantum gravity
- Loop quantum gravity
- Peres metric
- Regge calculus
- Universal wave function
