= Les Houches School of Physics =

International physics school center

Coordinates: 45.8989°N 6.7701°E

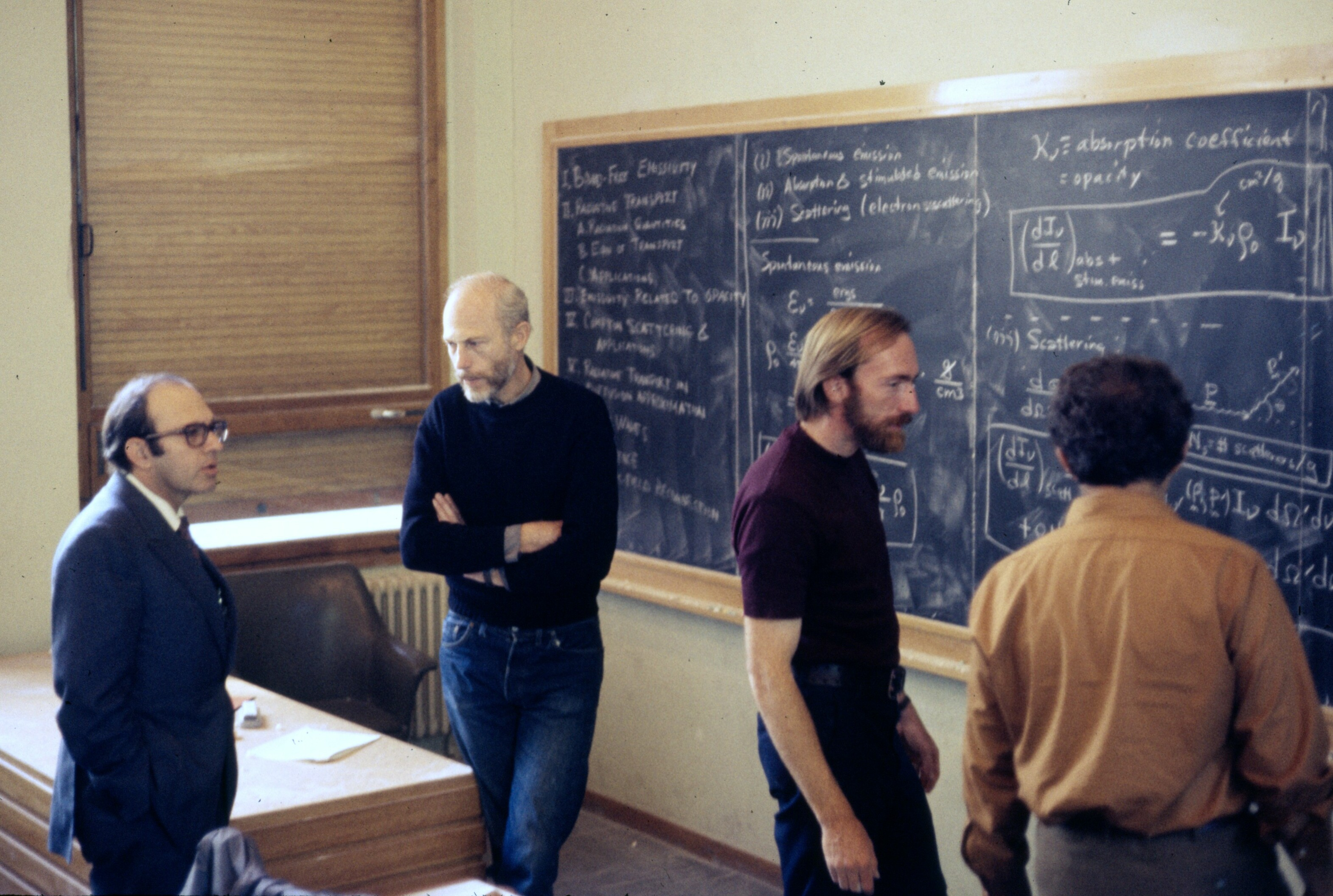
Summer, 1972, discussion in main lecture hall. From left, Yuval Ne'eman, Bryce DeWitt, Kip Thorne, Demetrios Christodoulou.

Les Houches School of Physics (French: École de Physique des Houches) is an international physics center dedicated to seasonal schools and workshops. It is located in Les Houches, France. The school was founded in 1951 by French scientist Cécile DeWitt-Morette.

Between its participants there have been famous Nobel laureates in Physics like Enrico Fermi, Wolfgang Pauli, Murray Gell-Mann and John Bardeen amongst others. According to former director of the school, Jean Zinn-Justin, the school is the "mother of all modern schools of physics”.

Since 2017, it is a Joint Research Service (French: Unité mixte de service, UMS) of the French National Centre for Scientific Research (CNRS) and the Grenoble Alpes University. In 2020, it was recognized as a EPS Historic Site by the European Physical Society (EPS).

== History ==
The school was founded by Cécile DeWitt-Morette in 1951. She was 29 years old at the time, had married physicist Bryce DeWitt a week before, and was still a postdoctoral researcher in the United States. The school was created as a post-World War II effort to improve the standard of modern physics in Europe, which was lagging behind the United States. She was inspired by her experience in the Girl Scouts and 1949 Richard Feynman's Ann Arbor annual Summer Symposium, at the University of Michigan, which DeWitt-Morette attended.

She quickly gathered the institutional and financial support of Pierre Victor Auger (then director of the Natural Sciences Department at UNESCO), the CNRS, Albert Châtelet (dean of faculty of physics of the University of Paris) and Pierre Donzelot in charge of the French Ministry of Education. With a reduced budget, she settled to open the school in a rustic farm surrounded by chalets, a few kilometers from the village of Les Houches.

The school was publicized by her French colleagues: Yves Rocard at the École normale supérieure, Louis Leprince-Ringuet at École polytechnique, Louis de Broglie and Alexandre Proca at the Institut Henri Poincaré, and Francis Perrin at the Collège de France and CEA who hired a secretary to handle the paperwork. Louis Néel acquired the patronage of the Grenoble faculty of science in order for the school to be legally attached to the University of Grenoble. DeWitt-Morette also obtained international support from J. Robert Oppenheimer, Enrico Fermi, Julian Schwinger and Victor Weisskopf.

The first session in 1951 was attended by young French professors like Pierre Grivet, Alfred Kastler and Théo Kahan, as well as by famous physicists from abroad including Walter Heitler, Léon van Hove, Emilio Segrè, Walter Kohn and Wolfgang Pauli. The first lessons were given by Van Hove on quantum mechanics.

Up until the 1960s, the students at the school were cut off from the outside world with the bare minimum in amenities. Nobel laureate Claude Cohen-Tannoudji, a student in 1955, recalled

It was extremely spartan ... We were lodged in small wooden chalets, barely furnished. The classroom was an old chalet slightly below. We sat on canvas chairs, the chalkboard was primitive, discussions happened outside, on the pastures. It was rough, but at the same time very charming, very bonne franquette, an extremely pleasant atmosphere.

Yves Rocard and Maurice Lévy, inspired by the school, founded a summer school in Cargèse, Corsica, which they called the '‘Les Houches on the beach". Subsequently, a number of scientific summer schools opened all over Europe following the same model, partly with the support of Advanced Study Institutes program of NATO.

In its early years, it caused some political controversy, with the French Communist Party accusing the school of US espionage and interference. A counter-school project against the allegedly Americanized Les Houches school was considered but was short-lived.

In 1977, a physics centre was created, specialised for shorter conferences which could take place all year round. In 1988, a pre-doctoral school was opened for young researchers entering into their PhD theses.

== Attendees ==
This table records attendees who later went on to receive either the Nobel Prize in Physics or the Fields Medal.

Attendee	Year(s) attended	Prize	Year prize awarded
Pierre Agostini	1997	Nobel Prize in Physics	2023
Philip W. Anderson	1967	Nobel Prize in Physics	1977
Alain Aspect	1982, 2016	Nobel Prize in Physics	2022
John Bardeen	1956	Nobel Prize in Physics	1956, 1972
Nicolaas Bloembergen	1964	Nobel Prize in Physics	1981
Aage Bohr	1955	Nobel Prize in Physics	1975
Owen Chamberlain	1957	Nobel Prize in Physics	1959
Steven Chu	1999	Nobel Prize in Physics	1997
Claude Cohen-Tannoudji	1955, 1964	Nobel Prize in Physics	1997
Alain Connes	1970	Fields Medal	1982
Leon Neil Cooper		Nobel Prize in Physics	1972
Eric Allin Cornell	1999	Nobel Prize in Physics	2001
François Englert	1979	Nobel Prize in Physics	2013
Enrico Fermi	1954	Nobel Prize in Physics	1938
Albert Fert	2012	Nobel Prize in Physics	2007
Richard Feynman	1976	Nobel Prize in Physics	1965
Roy J. Glauber	1954, 1964	Nobel Prize in Physics	2005
Murray Gell-Mann	1952	Nobel Prize in Physics	1969
Pierre-Gilles de Gennes	1953, 1967	Nobel Prize in Physics	1991
David Gross	1975	Nobel Prize in Physics	2004
F. Duncan M. Haldane	2008	Nobel Prize in Physics	2016
Serge Haroche	1990	Nobel Prize in Physics	2012
Gerardus t'Hooft	1975	Nobel Prize in Physics	1999
J. Hans D. Jensen	1953	Nobel Prize in Physics	1963
Alfred Kastler	1951	Nobel Prize in Physics	1966
Wolfgang Ketterle	1999, 2010	Nobel Prize in Physics	2001
Walter Kohn	1951, 1967	Nobel prize in Chemistry	1998
Willis Lamb	1964	Nobel Prize in Physics	1955
Tsung-Dao Lee	1975	Nobel Prize in Physics	1957
Anthony James Leggett	1985	Nobel Prize in Physics	2003
Anne L'Huillier	2016	Nobel Prize in Physics	2023
Syukuro Manabe	1999	Nobel Prize in Physics	2021
Arthur Bruce McDonald	1994	Nobel Prize in Physics	2003
Ben Roy Mottelson	1958	Nobel Prize in Physics	1975
Gérard Mourou	2015	Nobel Prize in Physics	2018
Louis Néel	1956, 1961	Nobel Prize in Physics	1970
Giorgio Parisi	2013, 2020, 2022	Nobel Prize in Physics	2021
Wolfgang Pauli	1951, 1952, 1955	Nobel Prize in Physics	1945
James Peebles	1979	Nobel Prize in Physics	2019
Roger Penrose	1963	Nobel Prize in Physics	2020
Arno Allan Penzias	1974	Nobel Prize in Physics	1978
William Daniel Phillips	1999, 2010	Nobel Prize in Physics	1997
Norman Foster Ramsey	1955	Nobel Prize in Physics	1989
Abdus Salam	1957	Nobel Prize in Physics	1979
Emilio Gino Segrè	1951	Nobel Prize in Physics	1959
Brian P. Schmidt	1990	Nobel Prize in Physics	2011
John Robert Schrieffer	1958	Nobel Prize in Physics	1972
Julian Schwinger	1955	Nobel Prize in Physics	1965
William Bradford Shockley	1953	Nobel Prize in Physics	1956
Stanislav Smirnov	2010	Fields Medal	2010
Jack Steinberger	1960	Nobel Prize in Physics	1988
René Thom		Fields Medal	1958
Kip Thorne	1963, 1966, 1972, 1982	Nobel Prize in Physics	2017
David Thouless	1998, 2018	Nobel Prize in Physics	2016
Charles Hard Townes	1955	Nobel Prize in Physics	1964
Martinus Veltman	1976	Nobel Prize in Physics	1999
Eugene Wigner	1955	Nobel Prize in Physics	1963
Ken Wilson	1975	Nobel Prize in Physics	1982
Ed Witten		Fields Medal	1990
C.N. Yang	1957	Nobel Prize in Physics	1957
Anton Zeilinger	2003	Nobel Prize in Physics	2022

== Prize ==
The Cecile DeWitt-Morette, Ecole de Physique des Houches Prize is awarded annually since 2019. It is awarded to scientists, less than 55 year old, from any nationality, who has made a remarkable contribution to physics and have attended the school as a lecturer or student. The jury is composed of members of the French Academy of Sciences. Since 2023, it is called the Cécile DeWitt-Morette / Ecole de Physique des Houches / Fundation CFM for Research prize.

The laureates are:

Year	Laureate	Institution	Field
2019	Francesca Ferlaino	University of Innsbruck	Cold atomic gases
2020	Juan Maldacena	Institute for Advanced Study, Princeton University	Quantum gravity, string theory and quantum field theory
2021	Frédéric Caupin	Claude Bernard University Lyon 1	Water under extreme conditions of pressure and temperature
2023	Nathalie Picqué	Max Planck Institute of Quantum Optics	Experimental optics, molecular physics and spectroscopy
