= Canonical quantum gravity =

Formulation of general relativity

In physics, canonical quantum gravity is an attempt to quantize the canonical formulation of general relativity (or canonical gravity). It is a Hamiltonian formulation of Einstein's general theory of relativity. The basic theory was outlined by Bryce DeWitt in a seminal 1967 paper, and based on earlier work by Peter G. Bergmann using the so-called canonical quantization techniques for constrained Hamiltonian systems invented by Paul Dirac. Dirac's approach allows the quantization of systems that include gauge symmetries using Hamiltonian techniques in a fixed gauge choice. Newer approaches based in part on the work of DeWitt and Dirac include the Hartle–Hawking state, Regge calculus, the Wheeler–DeWitt equation and loop quantum gravity.

== Canonical quantization ==
In the Hamiltonian formulation of ordinary classical mechanics the Poisson bracket is an important concept. A "canonical coordinate system" consists of canonical position and momentum variables that satisfy canonical Poisson-bracket relations,
$$\{ q_i , p_j \} = \delta_{ij}$$
where the Poisson bracket is given by
$$\{f,g\} = \sum_{i=1}^N \left(
\frac{\partial f}{\partial q_i} \frac{\partial g}{\partial p_i} - \frac{\partial f}{\partial p_i} \frac{\partial g}{\partial q_i}\right).$$
for arbitrary phase space functions $f (q_i , p_j)$ and $g (q_i , p_j)$. With the use of Poisson brackets, Hamilton's equations can be rewritten as,
$$\dot{q}_i = \{ q_i , H \},$$
$$\dot{p}_i = \{ p_i , H \}.$$

These equations describe a "flow" or orbit in phase space generated by the Hamiltonian $H$. Given any phase space function $F (q,p)$, we have
$${d \over dt} F (q_i,p_i) = \{ F , H \}.$$

In canonical quantization the phase space variables are promoted to quantum operators on a Hilbert space and the Poisson bracket between phase space variables is replaced by the canonical commutation relation:
$$[\hat{q} , \hat{p}] = i \hbar.$$

In the so-called position representation this commutation relation is realized by the choice:
$$\hat{q} \psi (q) = q \psi (q)$$
and
$$\hat{p} \psi (q) = -i \hbar {d \over d q} \psi (q)$$

The dynamics are described by Schrödinger equation:
$$i \hbar {\partial \over \partial t} \psi = \hat{H} \psi$$
where $\hat{H}$ is the operator formed from the Hamiltonian $H (q,p)$ with the replacement $q \mapsto q$ and $p \mapsto -i \hbar {d \over d q}$.

== Canonical quantization with constraints ==
Canonical classical general relativity is an example of a fully constrained theory. In constrained theories there are different kinds of phase space: the unrestricted (also called kinematic) phase space on which constraint functions are defined and the reduced phase space on which the constraints have already been solved. For canonical quantization in general terms, phase space is replaced by an appropriate Hilbert space and phase space variables are to be promoted to quantum operators.

In Dirac's approach to quantization the unrestricted phase space is replaced by the so-called kinematic Hilbert space and the constraint functions replaced by constraint operators implemented on the kinematic Hilbert space; solutions are then searched for. These quantum constraint equations are the central equations of canonical quantum general relativity, at least in the Dirac approach which is the approach usually taken.

In theories with constraints there is also the reduced phase space quantization where the constraints are solved at the classical level and the phase space variables of the reduced phase space are then promoted to quantum operators, however this approach was thought to be impossible in General relativity as it seemed to be equivalent to finding a general solution to the classical field equations. However, with the fairly recent development of a systematic approximation scheme for calculating observables of General relativity (for the first time) by Bianca Dittrich, based on ideas introduced by Carlo Rovelli, a viable scheme for a reduced phase space quantization of Gravity has been developed by Thomas Thiemann. However it is not fully equivalent to the Dirac quantization as the `clock-variables' must be taken to be classical in the reduced phase space quantization, as opposed to the case in the Dirac quantization.

A common misunderstanding is that coordinate transformations are the gauge symmetries of general relativity, when actually the true gauge symmetries are diffeomorphisms as defined by a mathematician (see the Hole argument) – which are much more radical. The first class constraints of general relativity are the spatial diffeomorphism constraint and the Hamiltonian constraint (also known as the Wheeler–De Witt equation) and imprint the spatial and temporal diffeomorphism invariance of the theory respectively. Imposing these constraints classically are basically admissibility conditions on the initial data, also they generate the 'evolution' equations (really gauge transformations) via the Poisson bracket. Importantly the Poisson bracket algebra between the constraints fully determines the classical theory – this is something that must in some way be reproduced in the semi-classical limit of canonical quantum gravity for it to be a viable theory of quantum gravity.

In Dirac's approach it turns out that the first class quantum constraints imposed on a wavefunction also generate gauge transformations. Thus the two step process in the classical theory of solving the constraints $C_I = 0$ (equivalent to solving the admissibility conditions for the initial data) and looking for the gauge orbits (solving the `evolution' equations) is replaced by a one step process in the quantum theory, namely looking for solutions $\Psi$ of the quantum equations $\hat{C}_I \Psi = 0$. This is because it obviously solves the constraint at the quantum level and it simultaneously looks for states that are gauge invariant because $\hat{C}_I$ is the quantum generator of gauge transformations. At the classical level, solving the admissibility conditions and evolution equations are equivalent to solving all of Einstein's field equations, this underlines the central role of the quantum constraint equations in Dirac's approach to canonical quantum gravity.

== Canonical quantization, diffeomorphism invariance and manifest finiteness ==
A diffeomorphism can be thought of as simultaneously 'dragging' the metric (gravitational field) and matter fields over the bare manifold while staying in the same coordinate system, and so are more radical than invariance under a mere coordinate transformation. This symmetry arises from the subtle requirement that the laws of general relativity cannot depend on any a-priori given space-time geometry.

This diffeomorphism invariance has an important implication: canonical quantum gravity will be manifestly finite as the ability to `drag' the metric function over the bare manifold means that small and large `distances' between abstractly defined coordinate points are gauge-equivalent! A more rigorous argument has been provided by Lee Smolin:

"A background independent operator must always be finite. This is because the regulator scale and the background metric are always introduced together in the regularization procedure. This is necessary, because the scale that the regularization parameter refers to must be described in terms of a background metric or coordinate chart introduced in the construction of the regulated operator. Because of this the dependence of the regulated operator on the cutoff, or regulator parameter, is related to its dependence on the background metric. When one takes the limit of the regulator parameter going to zero one isolates the non-vanishing terms. If these have any dependence on the regulator parameter (which would be the case if the term is blowing up) then it must also have dependence on the background metric. Conversely, if the terms that are nonvanishing in the limit the regulator is removed have no dependence on the background metric, it must be finite."

In fact, as mentioned below, Thomas Thiemann has explicitly demonstrated that loop quantum gravity (a well developed version of canonical quantum gravity) is manifestly finite even in the presence of all forms of matter! So there is no need for renormalization and the elimination of infinities. However, in other work, Thomas Thiemann admitted the need for renormalization as a way to fix quantization ambiguities.

In perturbative quantum gravity (from which the non-renormalization arguments originate), as with any perturbative scheme, one makes the reasonable assumption that the space time at large scales should be well approximated by flat space; one scatters gravitons on this approximately flat background and one finds that their scattering amplitude has divergences which cannot be absorbed into the redefinition of the Newton constant. Canonical quantum gravity theorists do not accept this argument; however they have not so far provided an alternative calculation of the graviton scattering amplitude which could be used to understand what happens with the terms found non-renormalizable in the perturbative treatment. A long-held expectation is that in a theory of quantum geometry such as canonical quantum gravity, geometric quantities such as area and volume become quantum observables and take non-zero discrete values, providing a natural regulator which eliminates infinities from the theory including those coming from matter contributions. This 'quantization' of geometric observables is in fact realized in loop quantum gravity (LQG).

== Canonical quantization in metric variables ==
The quantization is based on decomposing the metric tensor as follows,
$$g_{\mu\nu} dx^\mu \, dx^\nu = (-\,N^2+\beta_k\beta^k)dt^2+2\beta_k \, dx^k \, dt+\gamma_{ij} \, dx^i \, dx^j$$
where the summation over repeated indices is implied, the index 0 denotes time $\tau=x^0$, Greek indices run over all values 0, . . . ,3 and Latin indices run over spatial values 1, . . ., 3. The function $N$ is called the lapse function and the functions $\beta_k$ are called the shift functions. The spatial indices are raised and lowered using the spatial metric $\gamma_{ij}$ and its inverse $\gamma^{ij}$: $\gamma_{ij}\gamma^{jk}=\delta_i{}^k$ and $\beta^i=\gamma^{ij}\beta_j$, $\gamma=\det\gamma_{ij}$, where $\delta$ is the Kronecker delta. Under this decomposition the Einstein–Hilbert Lagrangian becomes, up to total derivatives,
$$L=\int d^3x\,N\gamma^{1/2}(K_{ij}K^{ij}-K^2+{}^{(3)}R)$$
where ${}^{(3)}R$ is the spatial scalar curvature computed with respect to the Riemannian metric $\gamma_{ij}$ and $K_{ij}$ is the extrinsic curvature,
$$K_{ij} = -\frac{1}{2} (\mathcal{L}_{n}\gamma)_{ij} = \frac{1}{2} N^{-1} \left(\nabla_j\beta_i+\nabla_i\beta_j-\frac{\partial\gamma_{ij}}{\partial t}\right),$$
where $\mathcal{L}$ denotes Lie-differentiation, $n$ is the unit normal to surfaces of constant $t$ and $\nabla_i$ denotes covariant differentiation with respect to the metric $\gamma_{ij}$. Note that $\gamma_{\mu\nu} = g_{\mu\nu} + n_{\mu}n_{\nu}$. DeWitt writes that the Lagrangian "has the classic form 'kinetic energy minus potential energy,' with the extrinsic curvature playing the role of kinetic energy and the negative of the intrinsic curvature that of potential energy." While this form of the Lagrangian is manifestly invariant under redefinition of the spatial coordinates, it makes general covariance opaque.

Since the lapse function and shift functions may be eliminated by a gauge transformation, they do not represent physical degrees of freedom. This is indicated in moving to the Hamiltonian formalism by the fact that their conjugate momenta, respectively $\pi$ and $\pi^i$, vanish identically (on shell and off shell). These are called primary constraints by Dirac. A popular choice of gauge, called synchronous gauge, is $N=1$ and $\beta_i=0$, although they can, in principle, be chosen to be any function of the coordinates. In this case, the Hamiltonian takes the form
$$H = \int d^3x \mathcal{H},$$
where
$$\mathcal{H} = \frac{1}{2} \gamma^{-1/2} (\gamma_{ik}\gamma_{jl} + \gamma_{il}\gamma_{jk} - \gamma_{ij} \gamma_{kl}) \pi^{ij}\pi^{kl}-\gamma^{1/2} {}^{(3)}R$$
and $\pi^{ij}$ is the momentum conjugate to $\gamma_{ij}$. Einstein's equations may be recovered by taking Poisson brackets with the Hamiltonian. Additional on-shell constraints, called secondary constraints by Dirac, arise from the consistency of the Poisson bracket algebra. These are $\mathcal{H} = 0$ and $\nabla_j\pi^{ij} = 0$. This is the theory which is being quantized in approaches to canonical quantum gravity.

It can be shown that six Einstein equations describing time evolution (really a gauge transformation) can be obtained by calculating the Poisson brackets of the three-metric and its conjugate momentum with a linear combination of the spatial diffeomorphism and Hamiltonian constraint. The vanishing of the constraints, giving the physical phase space, are the four other Einstein equations. That is, we have:

Spatial diffeomorphisms constraints
$$C_a (x) = 0$$
of which there are an infinite number – one for value of $x$, can be smeared by the so-called shift functions $\vec{N} (x)$ to give an equivalent set of smeared spatial diffeomorphism constraints,
$$C (\vec{N}) = \int d^3 x \, C_a (x) N^a (x).$$

These generate spatial diffeomorphisms along orbits defined by the shift function $N^a (x)$.

Hamiltonian constraints
$$H (x) = 0$$
of which there are an infinite number, can be smeared by the so-called lapse functions $N (x)$ to give an equivalent set of smeared Hamiltonian constraints,
$$H (N) = \int d^3 x \, H (x) N (x).$$

as mentioned above, the Poisson bracket structure between the (smeared) constraints is important because they fully determine the classical theory, and must be reproduced in the semi-classical limit of any theory of quantum gravity.

== The Wheeler–DeWitt equation ==
The Wheeler–DeWitt equation (sometimes called the Hamiltonian constraint, sometimes the Einstein–Schrödinger equation) is rather central as it encodes the dynamics at the quantum level. It is analogous to Schrödinger's equation, except as the time coordinate, $t$, is unphysical, a physical wavefunction can't depend on $t$ and hence Schrödinger's equation reduces to a constraint:

$$\hat{H} \Psi = 0.$$

Using metric variables lead to seemingly unsurmountable mathematical difficulties when trying to promote the classical expression to a well-defined quantum operator, and as such decades went by without making progress via this approach. This problem was circumvented and the formulation of a well-defined Wheeler–De-Witt equation was first accomplished with the introduction of Ashtekar–Barbero variables and the loop representation, this well defined operator formulated by Thomas Thiemann.

Before this development the Wheeler–De-Witt equation had only been formulated in symmetry-reduced models, such as quantum cosmology.

== Canonical quantization in Ashtekar–Barbero variables and LQG ==
Many of the technical problems in canonical quantum gravity revolve around the constraints. Canonical general relativity was originally formulated in terms of metric variables, but there seemed to be insurmountable mathematical difficulties in promoting the constraints to quantum operators because of their highly non-linear dependence on the canonical variables. The equations were much simplified with the introduction of Ashtekars new variables. Ashtekar variables describe canonical general relativity in terms of a new pair canonical variables closer to that of gauge theories. In doing so it introduced an additional constraint, on top of the spatial diffeomorphism and Hamiltonian constraint, the Gauss gauge constraint.

The loop representation is a quantum hamiltonian representation of gauge theories in terms of loops. The aim of the loop representation, in the context of Yang–Mills theories is to avoid the redundancy introduced by Gauss gauge symmetries allowing to work directly in the space of Gauss gauge invariant states. The use of this representation arose naturally from the Ashtekar–Barbero representation as it provides an exact non-perturbative description and also because the spatial diffeomorphism constraint is easily dealt with within this representation.

Within the loop representation Thiemann has provided a well defined canonical theory in the presence of all forms of matter and explicitly demonstrated it to be manifestly finite! So there is no need for renormalization. However, as LQG approach is well suited to describe physics at the Planck scale, there are difficulties in making contact with familiar low energy physics and establishing it has the correct semi-classical limit.

== The problem of time ==
All canonical theories of general relativity have to deal with the problem of time. In quantum gravity, the problem of time is a conceptual conflict between general relativity and quantum mechanics. In canonical general relativity, time is just another coordinate as a result of general covariance. In quantum field theories, especially in the Hamiltonian formulation, the formulation is split between three dimensions of space, and one dimension of time. Roughly speaking, the problem of time is that there is none in general relativity. This is because in general relativity the Hamiltonian is a constraint that must vanish. However, in any canonical theory, the Hamiltonian generates time translations. Therefore, we arrive at the conclusion that "nothing moves" ("there is no time") in general relativity. Since "there is no time", the usual interpretation of quantum mechanics measurements at given moments of time breaks down. This problem of time is the broad banner for all interpretational problems of the formalism.

A canonical formalism of James York's conformal decomposition of geometrodynamics, leading to the "York time" of general relativity, has been developed by Charles Wang. This work has later been further developed by him and his collaborators to an approach of identifying and quantizing time amenable to a large class of scale-invariant dilaton gravity-matter theories.

== The problem of quantum cosmology ==
The problem of quantum cosmology is that the physical states that solve the constraints of canonical quantum gravity represent quantum states of the entire universe and as such exclude an outside observer, however an outside observer is a crucial element in most interpretations of quantum mechanics.

== See also ==
- ADM formalism
- Ashtekar variables
- Canonical quantization
- Canonical coordinates
- Diffeomorphism
- Hole argument
- Regge Calculus
- Loop quantum gravity is one of this family of theories.
- Loop quantum cosmology (LQC) is a finite, symmetry reduced model of loop quantum gravity.
- Problem of time

== Notes ==
1. Bergmann, P. (1966). "Hamilton–Jacobi and Schrödinger Theory in Theories with First-Class Hamiltonian Constraints". Physical Review. 144 (4): 1078–1080. Bibcode:1966PhRv..144.1078B. doi:10.1103/PhysRev.144.1078.
2. Dewitt, B. (1967). "Quantum Theory of Gravity. I. The Canonical Theory". Physical Review. 160 (5): 1113–1148. Bibcode:1967PhRv..160.1113D. doi:10.1103/PhysRev.160.1113.
3. Dirac, P. A. M. (1958). "Generalized Hamiltonian Dynamics". Proceedings of the Royal Society of London A. 246 (1246): 326–332. Bibcode:1958RSPSA.246..326D. doi:10.1098/rspa.1958.0141. JSTOR 100496.
4. Thiemann, T. (1996). "Anomaly-free formulation of non-perturbative, four-dimensional Lorentzian quantum gravity". Physics Letters B. 380 (3–4): 257–264. arXiv:gr-qc/9606088. Bibcode:1996PhLB..380..257T. doi:10.1016/0370-2693(96)00532-1. S2CID 8691449.

== Sources ==
- Arnowitt, R.; Deser, S.; Misner, C. W. (2008). "The Dynamics of General Relativity". General Relativity and Gravitation. 40 (9): 1997–2027. arXiv:gr-qc/0405109. Bibcode:2008GReGr..40.1997A. doi:10.1007/s10714-008-0661-1. S2CID 14054267.
- Witten, L. (1962). Gravitation: An Introduction to Current Research. John Wiley & Sons. pp. 227–265.
- Dirac, P. A. M. (1958). "The Theory of Gravitation in Hamiltonian Form". Proceedings of the Royal Society of London A. 246 (1246): 333–343. Bibcode:1958RSPSA.246..333D. doi:10.1098/rspa.1958.0142. JSTOR 100497. S2CID 122053391.
- Dirac, P. A. M. (1959). "Fixation of Coordinates in the Hamiltonian Theory of Gravitation". Physical Review. 114 (3): 924–930. Bibcode:1959PhRv..114..924D. doi:10.1103/PhysRev.114.924.
- Dirac, P. A. M. (1964). Lectures on quantum mechanics. Yeshiva University. ISBN 0-387-51916-5.
