= Charles R. Doering =

American mathematician (1956–2021)

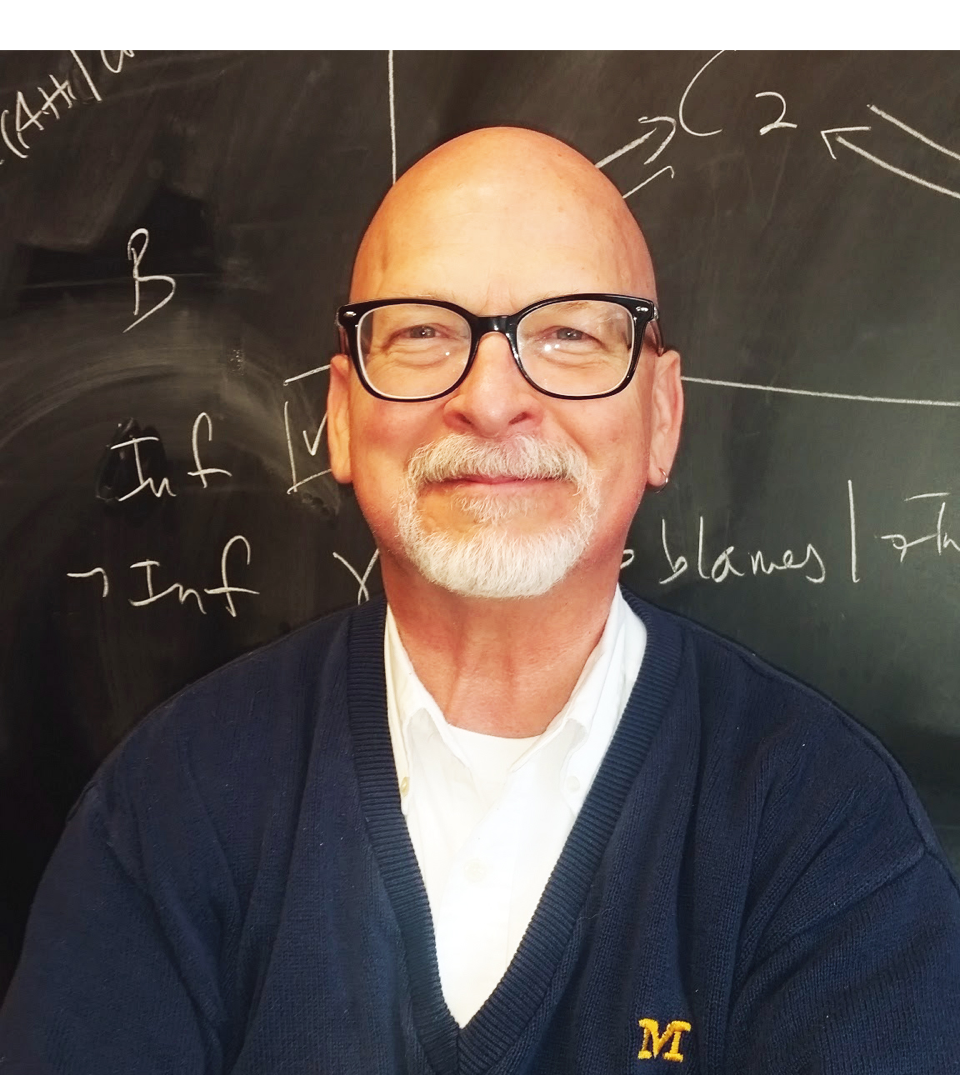
- Charles Rogers Doering
- Born: 7 January 1956
- Died: 15 May 2021 (aged 65)
- Education: Antioch College; University of Cincinnati; The University of Texas at Austin
- Known for: Fluid dynamics
- Scientific career
- Fields: Mathematician
- Workplaces: University of Michigan; Los Alamos National Laboratory; Clarkson University
- Doctoral advisor: Cécile DeWitt-Morette

Charles Rogers Doering was a professor of mathematics at the University of Michigan, Ann Arbor. He is notable for his research that is generally focused on the analysis of stochastic dynamical systems arising in biology, chemistry and physics, to systems of nonlinear partial differential equations. Recently he had been focusing on fundamental questions in fluid dynamics as part of the $1M Clay Institute millennium challenge concerning the regularity of solutions to the equations of fluid dynamics. With J. D. Gibbon, he notably co-authored the book Applied Analysis of the Navier-Stokes Equations, published by Cambridge University Press. He died on May 15, 2021.

== Education ==
He received his BS from Antioch College, 1977; his MS from the University of Cincinnati, 1978; and his PhD from The University of Texas at Austin under Cécile DeWitt-Morette, 1985, in the area of applying stochastic differential equations to statistical mechanics and field theory. His masters thesis was entitled: Generation of solutions to the Einstein equations. His PhD thesis was entitled, Functional stochastic differential equations: mathematical theory of nonlinear parabolic systems with applications in field theory and statistical mechanics.

== Career ==
In 1986–87, he was a Director's Postdoctoral Fellow 1986–87, Center for Nonlinear Studies, Los Alamos National Laboratory; in 1987–96, he rose to Professor of Physics, 1987–96, Clarkson University; in 1994–96, he was Deputy Director of Los Alamos' Center for Nonlinear Studies. He joined the faculty of the University of Michigan in 1996, where he eventually became the Nicholas D. Kazarinoff Collegiate Professor of Complex Systems, Mathematics and Physics and the Director of the Center for the Study of Complex Systems. He was very active in the Geophysical Fluid Dynamics Program at the Woods Hole Oceanographic Institute.

== Honors ==
Doering received a number of honours including the Presidential Young Investigator Award, 1989–94; Fulbright Scholarship, 2001; 1995; Fellow of the American Physical Society, 2001; the Humboldt Research Award, 2003. He was named Fellow of the Society for Industrial and Applied Mathematics in 2011, a Simons Foundation Fellow in Theoretical Physics in 2014, a Guggenheim Fellowship in Applied Mathematics in 2016, and a Simons Foundation Fellow in Mathematics in 2021.

== See also ==
- Quantum Aspects of Life
