= Cécile DeWitt-Morette =

French mathematician and physicist (1922–2017)

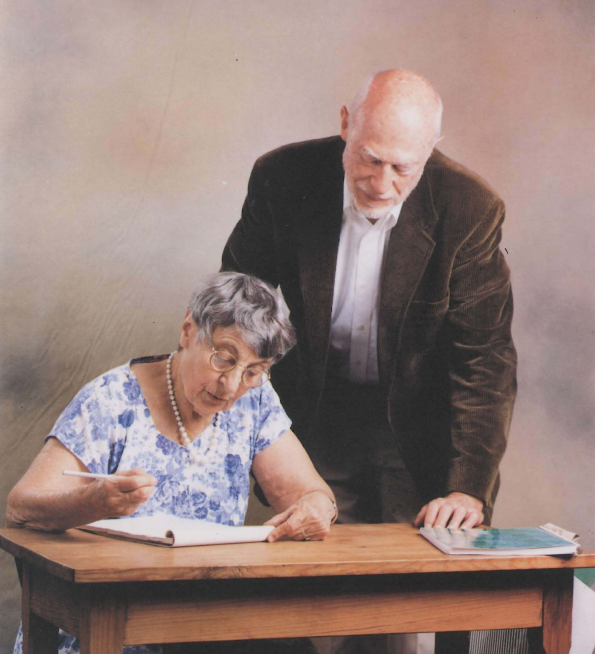
- Cécile DeWitt-Morette (left) with Bryce DeWitt (right)
- Born: Cécile Andrée Paule Morette; 21 December 1922; Paris, France
- Died: 8 May 2017 (aged 94)
- Education: University of Paris
- Known for: École de Physique des Houches
- Spouse: Bryce DeWitt (m. 1951–2004)
- Children: 4
- Awards: Marcel Grossmann Award
- Scientific career
- Fields: Theoretical physics Functional integration
- Workplaces: Dublin Institute for Advanced Studies; Institute for Advanced Study; University of North Carolina at Chapel Hill; University of Texas at Austin
- Thesis: Sur la production des mésons dans les chocs entre nucléons (1947)
- Doctoral advisor: Walter Heitler; Louis de Broglie
- Doctoral students: Theodore A. Jacobson; Charles R. Doering

Cécile Andrée Paule DeWitt-Morette (21 December 1922 – 8 May 2017) was a French mathematician and physicist. She founded the Les Houches School of Physics in the French Alps. For this and her publications, she was awarded the American Society of the French Legion of Honour 2007 Medal for Distinguished Achievement. Attendees at the summer school included over twenty students who would go on to be Nobel Prize winners, including Pierre-Gilles de Gennes, Georges Charpak, and Claude Cohen-Tannoudji, who identify the school for assisting in their success.

== Biography ==
=== Early life and education ===
Cécile Morette was born in 1922 and brought up in Normandy, where in 1943 she earned her License des Sciences from the University of Caen.

Despite her original intention to become a surgeon, she completed her degree in mathematics, physics, and chemistry due to limited opportunities to attend medical school in France during World War II.

Following the completion of her bachelor's degree, Morette entered the University of Paris. She was studying there when her mother, sister, and grandmother were killed in the Allied bombing of Caen to support the D-Day landings. In 1944, while still working toward her doctorate at the University of Paris, Morette took a job at the Centre National de la Recherche Scientifique (CNRS), then under the direction of Frédéric Joliot-Curie. She worked as a scholar at the Dublin Institute for Advanced Studies from 1946 to 1947. In 1947, she completed her Ph.D. (Sur la production des mésons dans les chocs entre nucléons).

=== Career ===
In 1948 she was invited to the Institute for Advanced Study (IAS) in Princeton, New Jersey by Robert Oppenheimer, who had recently become director of the institute. While there, she became interested in Richard Feynman's path integral formulation for computations in quantum mechanics and worked to make this approach rigorous, which ultimately led to wide applications of the Feynman diagrams and the underlying mathematics. She also met her future husband and scientific collaborator, American physicist Bryce DeWitt while at IAS; the couple married in 1951, and would have four children.

To revitalize French research in mathematics and physics following the war, DeWitt-Morette established a summer school, Les Houches School of Physics, at Les Houches in the French Alps in 1951. She told stories of how she obtained the funding by tricking her way into a minister's office and then persuaded her male colleagues to support the idea by pretending that the idea was theirs.

Morette was to lead this school for the next 22 years. The school was able to list twenty former students or lecturers at the school who went on to become Nobel laureates. The French mathematician Alain Connes, who is a recipient of the Fields Medal, credited the summer school as responsible for his career in mathematics. Nobel laureates Pierre-Gilles de Gennes, Georges Charpak, and Claude Cohen-Tannoudji identified the school as helping with their success. In 1958, NATO funded a series of advanced study centres that were based on Morette's summer school. In 1987, Cecile DeWitt-Morette participated in a Quantum Gravity Seminar in Moscow together with her husband.

Bryce DeWitt died in 2004 from cancer. In 2007, DeWitt-Morette was awarded the American Society of the French Legion of Honour 2007 Medal for Distinguished Achievement in New York. She was then the Jane and Roland Blumberg Centennial Professor Emerita of Physics at the University of Texas at Austin.

== Work ==
In 1951, she independently developed a formula to calculate path integrals. This is now known as the Van Vleck–Pauli–Morette formula, named after John Hasbrouck Van Vleck, Wolfgang Pauli and her.

In 1953 a trustee of the unusual Gravity Research Foundation, Agnew Hunter Bahnson, contacted Bryce DeWitt with a proposal to fund a gravity research institute. The proposed name was agreed as the "Institute for Field Physics" and it was established in 1956 at the University of North Carolina at Chapel Hill under the direction of Bryce and Morette. Under the Institute of Field Physics DeWitt-Morette and her husband organized the Chapel Hill Conference on gravitation in 1957. "She was an instructor in the department from 1956-1971 but was offered a position at the University of Texas at Austin after UNC failed to promote her despite her significant contributions to physics and the department. The DeWitts then left together with their students in January of 1972."

In 1958 Cécile DeWitt-Morette invited Léon Motchane to see the Institute of Advanced Study in USA which inspired Léon Motchane to establish an institute dedicated to fundamental research in three areas: mathematics, theoretical physics, and the methodology of human sciences upon which he later created the Institut des Hautes Études Scientifiques.

=== Expedition to test general relativity ===
In 1972 Morette and her husband led an expedition to Mauritania to confirm that light was deflected in line with the theory of general relativity, to improve on Arthur Eddington's 1919 experiment. These measurements were made during the solar eclipse there. Comparison of the pictures with those made six months later confirmed that, in line with theory, light was indeed bent when passing by massive objects. Morette and her husband joined the faculty of the University of Texas in 1972. She began to work increasingly in physics rather than in mathematics, and she became a Professor in 1985.

== Awards and honours ==
In 2007 Professor Cécile DeWitt-Morette was awarded the American Society of the French Legion of Honour 2007 Medal for Distinguished Achievement in New York. She was then the Jane and Roland Blumberg Centennial Professor Emerita of Physics at the University of Texas at Austin.

In 2026, DeWitt-Morette was announced as one of 72 historical women in STEM whose names have been proposed to be added to the 72 men already celebrated on the Eiffel Tower. The plan was announced by the Mayor of Paris, Anne Hidalgo following the recommendations of a committee led by Isabelle Vauglin of Femmes et Sciences and Jean-François Martins, representing the operating company which runs the Eiffel Tower.

== Selected works ==
- L’Energie Atomique, de Gigord, Paris (1946)
- Cross-Sections for Production of Artificial Mesons, C. Morette and H.W. Peng, Nature 160 (1947) 59-60
- Particules Elémentaires, Hermann, Paris (1951)
- Black holes (Cécile DeWitt-Morette, Bryce Seligman DeWitt, 1973)
- (With Y. Choquet-Bruhat and Margaret Dillard-Bleick) Analysis, Manifolds and Physics, (1977)
- I.T. for Intelligent Grandmothers, (1987)
- (With Y. Choquet-Bruhat) Analysis, Manifolds, and Physics. Part II. (1989)
- Quantum field theory: perspective and prospective (1999) ISBN 0-7923-5672-1 (Cécile DeWitt-Morette, Jean-Bernard Zuber, eds.)
- (With P. Cartier) Functional Integration, Action and Symmetries (2006)
