= Léon Motchane =

French mathematician

- Born: 19 June 1900; St. Petersburg, Russia
- Died: 17 January 1990 (aged 89); Paris, France
- Scientific career
- Workplaces: Institut des Hautes Études Scientifiques
- Doctoral advisor: Gustave Choquet

Léon Motchane (19 June 1900 – 17 January 1990) was a French industrialist and mathematician and the founder of the Institut des Hautes Études Scientifiques in Bures-sur-Yvette.

== Biography ==
Léon Motchane was of mixed Russian and Swiss parentage, of Jewish descent. He left Russia after the Russian Revolution in 1918, emigrated to Switzerland and then to France in 1924. Encouraged by the French mathematician Paul Montel, Motchane eventually received a doctorate in mathematics at age 54 under the direction of Gustave Choquet. In 1958 Cécile DeWitt-Morette invited Léon Motchane to see the Institute for Advanced Study in the USA which inspired Léon Motchane to establish an institute dedicated to fundamental research in three areas: mathematics, theoretical physics, and the methodology of human sciences (the latter area never really took root at the IHÉS). By the moral support of the American physicist Robert Oppenheimer, President of the IAS at that time, and the financial support of several major private companies he managed to create the Institut des Hautes Études Scientifiques in 1958. It moved to its present location in Bois-Marie in Bures-sur-Yvette in 1962. He attended the International Congress of Mathematicians in August 1966 held in Moscow and accepted Alexander Grothendieck's Fields Medal on his behalf as Grothendieck boycotted the Congress to protest over the treatment of the dissident writers. Motchane remained the IHÉS director from 1958 until he retired in 1971 when, the Dutch mathematician Nicolaas Kuiper, took over as the director of IHÉS.

One of Motchane's sons, Didier, became a politician.
