= Ali Mostafazadeh =

Iranian-Turkish physicist

- علی مصطفی‌زاده
- Born: July 17, 1965 (age 61); Tabriz, Iran
- Education: Boğaziçi University (B.S.); University of Texas at Austin (PhD)
- Scientific career
- Workplaces: Koç University
- Thesis: Supersymmetry, Path Integration, and the Atiyah-Singer Index Theorem (1994)
- Doctoral advisor: Bryce DeWitt
- Website: https://mysite.ku.edu.tr/amostafazadeh/

Ali Mostafazadeh (Persian: علی مصطفی‌زاده; born July 17, 1965 Tabriz, Iran) is a theoretical physicist at Koç University and a full member of Turkish Academy of Sciences since 2007.

== Early life and education ==
Mostafazadeh was born to Afsar Mosannen-Amini and Ebrahim Mostafazadeh in Tabriz, Iran. He received a dual degree in mathematics and physics in 1989 from the Boğaziçi University, Istanbul in 1989. He subsequently moved to University of Texas at Austin and received his PhD under the guidance of Bryce DeWitt in 1994, with the dissertation Supersymmetry, Path Integration, and the Atiyah-Singer Index Theorem.

Since 2007, he's been an executive board member of the Research Institute for Fundamental Sciences at TÜBİTAK.

== Selected publications ==
- Mostafazadeh, Ali (2002-01-01). "Pseudo-Hermiticity versus PT symmetry: The necessary condition for the reality of the spectrum of a non-Hermitian Hamiltonian". Journal of Mathematical Physics. 43 (1): 205–214. arXiv:math-ph/0107001. Bibcode:2002JMP....43..205M. doi:10.1063/1.1418246. ISSN 0022-2488.
