= On the Origin of Time =

2023 book by Thomas Hertog

- Author: Thomas Hertog
- Language: English
- Subject: Cosmology
- Genre: Scientific literature
- Publisher: Penguin book, Odile Jacob
- Publication date: 2023
- Publication place: United Kingdom
- Pages: 352
- ISBN: 9781911709084
- Website: https://www.penguin.co.uk/books/440139/on-the-origin-of-time-by-hertog-thomas/9781911709084

On the Origin of Time is a 2023 book by physicist Thomas Hertog about the theories of Stephen Hawking. Hertog is a Belgian cosmologist working at KU Leuven university, who worked extensively with Hawking. He wrote the book at Hawking's request to popularize the top-down cosmological theory that they had developed together.

== Synopsis ==
The cosmological theory that Hawking developed with his PhD student is that the origin of time is the Big Bang and that the laws of physics do not precede the Big Bang, but were born with it. The main hypothesis of their work is that physical laws evolve with time, at least during the very first moment of the universe and are not transcendent and immutable at the scale of the birth of our universe as supposed by the theories of Newton and Einstein.

The book's epigraph is "The question of origin hides the origin of the question", a sentence borrowed by Hertog from the Belgian poet François Jacqmin from Liège.
