= Didier Motchane =

French politician

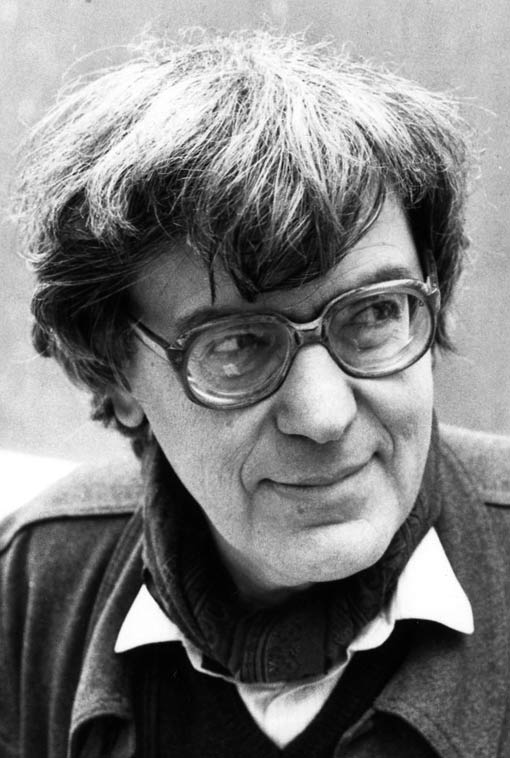

Member of the European Parliament
- In office 1979–1989

Personal details
- Born: 17 September 1931; Paris
- Died: 29 October 2017 (aged 86)

Didier Motchane (17 September 1931 – 29 October 2017) was a French politician who served as a member of the European Parliament from 1979 to 1989.

He was born in Paris on 17 September 1931 to mathematician Léon Motchane. Didier Motchane later married actress and film director Dominique Cabrera.

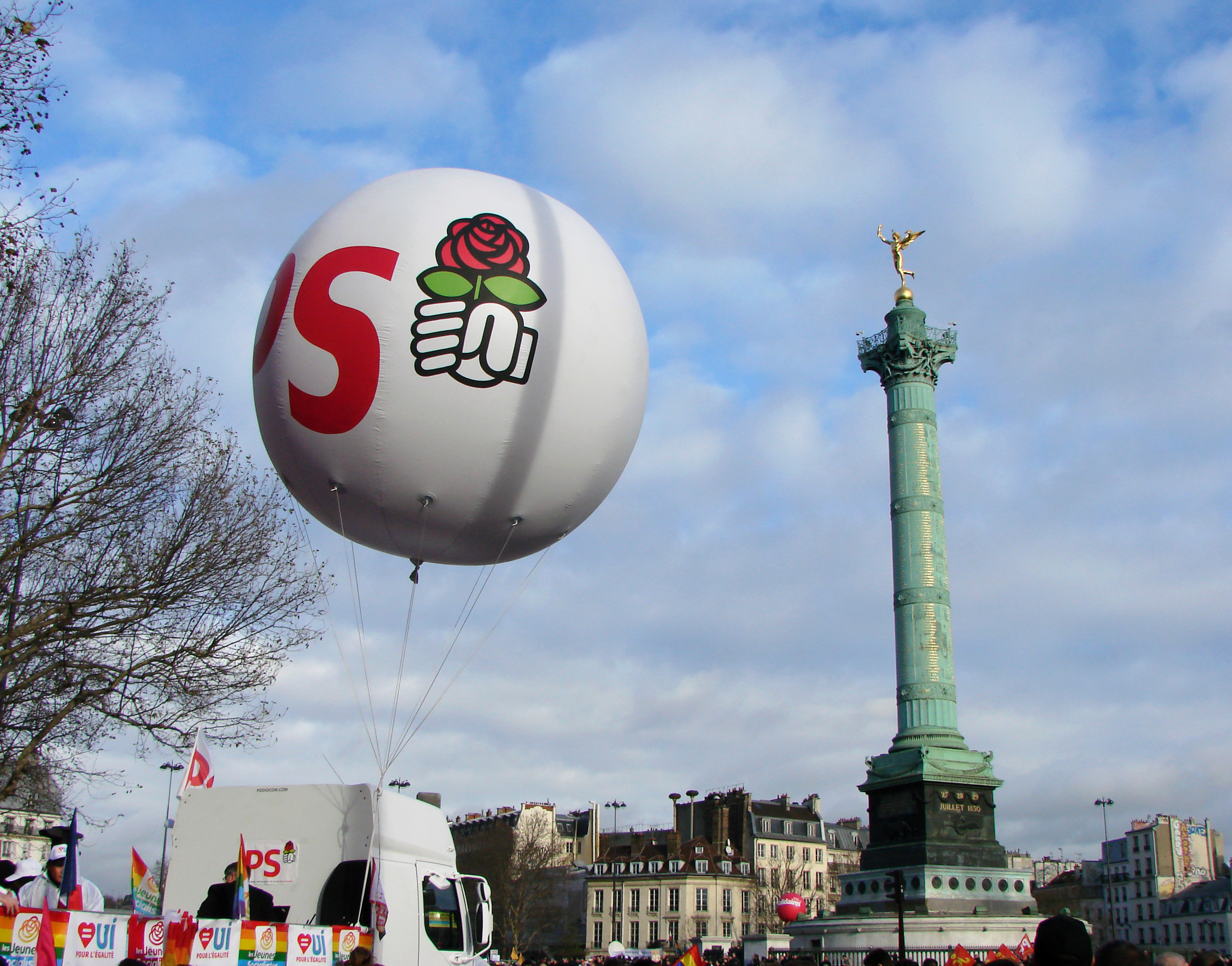
The logo of the fist with a rose in a 2012 demonstration.

Motchane cofounded the Centre d'études, de recherches et d'éducation socialiste in 1965, and was active in the Socialist Party and the Union of the Left. He is often credited with the fist and rose design used by socialist political organizations worldwide, which he claimed to have “invented” in his 2010 memoirs, but the initiative is disputed between other party leaders of the time.

He was a member of the European Parliament from 1979 to 1989, representing the Socialist Party. He left the party in 1993 after a disagreement with François Mitterrand, and helped establish the Citizen and Republican Movement.

Motchane died of cancer at the age of 86 on 29 October, 2017.
