= Hartle–Thorne metric =

Approximate solution to Einstein's field equations

The Hartle–Thorne metric is an approximate solution of the vacuum Einstein field equations of general relativity that describes the exterior of a slowly and rigidly rotating, stationary and axially symmetric body.

The metric was found by James Hartle and Kip Thorne in the 1960s to study the spacetime outside neutron stars, white dwarfs and supermassive stars. It can be shown that it is an approximation to the Kerr metric (which describes a rotating black hole) when the quadrupole moment is set as $q=-a^2aM^3$, which is the correct value for a black hole but not, in general, for other astrophysical objects.

== Metric ==
Up to second order in the angular momentum $J$, mass $M$ and quadrupole moment $q$, the metric in spherical coordinates is given by

$$\begin{align}g_{tt} &= - \left(1-\frac{2M}{r}+\frac{2q}{r^3} P_2 +\frac{2Mq}{r^4} P_2 +\frac{2q^2}{r^6} P^2_2
-\frac{2}{3} \frac{J^2}{r^4} (2P_2+1)\right), \\
g_{t\phi} &= -\frac{2J}{r}\sin^2\theta, \\
g_{rr} &= 1 + \frac{2M}{r} +\frac{4M^2}{r^2} -\frac{2qP_2}{r^3} -\frac{10MqP_2}{r^4}
+ \frac{1}{12} \frac{q^2\left(8P_2^2-16P_2+77\right)}{r^6} +\frac{2J^2(8P_2-1)}{r^4},\\
g_{\theta\theta} &=r^2 \left(1-\frac{2qP_2}{r^3} -\frac{5MqP_2}{r^4} +\frac{1}{36}\frac{q^2\left(44P_2^2 +8P_2 -43\right)}{r^6}
+\frac{J^2P_2}{r^4}\right),\\
g_{\phi\phi}&=r^2\sin^2\theta\left(1-\frac{2qP_2}{r^3} -\frac{5MqP_2}{r^4} +\frac{1}{36}\frac{q^2\left(44P_2^2 +8P_2 -43\right)}{r^6}
+\frac{J^2P_2}{r^4}\right),
\end{align}$$

where $P_2=\frac{3\cos^2\theta-1}{2}.$

== See also ==
- Kerr metric
