= James Hartle =

American physicist (1939–2023)

James B. Hartle
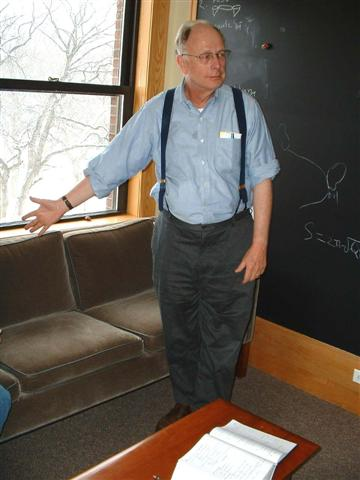
- Hartle in 2007
- Born: James Burkett Hartle; August 17, 1939; Baltimore, Maryland, U.S.
- Died: May 17, 2023 (aged 83); Zurich, Switzerland
- Education: Princeton University (AB 1960); California Institute of Technology (PhD 1964)
- Known for: Consistent histories; Hartle-Thorne metric; Hartle-Hawking state; Brill–Hartle geon; Gravity (2003)
- Scientific career
- Fields: General relativity; Astrophysics; Quantum mechanics
- Workplaces: University of California, Santa Barbara; Santa Fe Institute
- Doctoral advisor: Murray Gell-Mann

James Burkett Hartle (August 17, 1939 – May 17, 2023) was an American theoretical physicist known for his work in general relativity, astrophysics, and interpreting quantum mechanics. He was one of the pioneers of quantum cosmology. He joined the faculty of the University of California, Santa Barbara in 1966, and was a member of the external faculty of the Santa Fe Institute.

== Early life and education ==
Hartle was born on August 17, 1939, in Baltimore, Maryland, to Anna Elizabeth Burkett and Charles James Hartle, who worked for IBM. His father's job required the family to relocated multiple times while Hartle was growing up. He attended public schools in Ohio and Connecticut, as well as the Gilman School in Baltimore. There, Hartle became interested in physics thanks to his teacher, Bill Potter. He began as an engineering major upon matriculation at Princeton University, but switched to physics due to the influence of John Archibald Wheeler.

Hartle earned his AB at Princeton in 1960 and his Ph.D. in particle physics under Murray Gell-Mann in 1964 at the California Institute of Technology (Caltech). Afterwards, he briefly taught at Princeton before accepting a position at the University of California, Santa Barbara.

== Work ==
With Dieter Brill in 1964, he discovered the Brill–Hartle geon, an approximate solution realizing Wheeler's suggestion of a hypothetical phenomenon in which a gravitational wave packet is confined to a compact region of spacetime by the gravitational attraction of its own field energy.

Hartle then turned his attention towards astrophysics. Starting in 1967, Hartle worked with Kip Thorne on the physics of rotating compact objects, such as neutron stars, including the influence of the coupling of their multipole moments to the spacetime curvature of nearby objects, as described by general relativity. They discovered the Hartle–Thorne metric, an approximate solution which describes the exterior of a slowly and rigidly rotating, stationary and axially symmetric body.

Funded by an award from the Sloan Foundation, Hartle spent a year at the Institute for Theoretical Astronomy at the University of Cambridge, where he met Stephen Hawking, with whom he became a long-time collaborator. In 1976, Hartle and Hawking utilized path integrals to show that black holes must emit radiation (later dubbed Hawking radiation), the same conclusion Hawking himself had reached two years earlier. Their work on the thermodynamics of black holes led to the development of the Euclidean approach to quantum gravity. In 1983, Hartle and Hawking proposed the no-boundary wave function for the Universe. Their aim was to explain the initial conditions of the Big Bang model of cosmology. Hartle considered this to be his greatest contribution to the subject.

In later decades, Hartle collaborated with Gell-Mann and others to develop an alternative to the standard Copenhagen interpretation of quantum mechanics, more general and appropriate to quantum cosmology, based on the notion of consistent histories.

Hartle published his textbook on general relativity, Gravity: An Introduction to Einstein's General Relativity, in 2003. Reviewers have praised the book for its lucid explanations and focus on physical insight rather than mathematical details. Only requires familiarity with calculus and differential equations, making the book suitable for junior or senior undergraduates in physics. He explained his vision for teaching general relativity to undergraduates in a 2006 article.

Hartle was a founder of the Kavli Institute for Theoretical Physics at UC Santa Barbara and served as its director from 1995 to 1997.

He was elected to the American Philosophical Society in 2016. He was also a Fellow of the American Physical Society (APS), a Guggenheim Fellow, and was elected to the National Academy of Sciences. He received the 2009 Einstein Prize from the APS for his "broad range of fundamental contributions to relativistic stars, quantum fields in curved spacetime, and especially quantum cosmology."

== Personal life ==
Hartle married Mary Jo Wheeler, a niece of John Archibald Wheeler, in 1984.

Hartle was diagnosed with Alzheimer's disease in 2022. He died in Zurich, Switzerland on May 17, 2023, at the age of 83.
