= Problem of time =

Conceptual conflict between general relativity and quantum mechanics

In theoretical physics, the problem of time is a conceptual conflict between quantum mechanics and general relativity. Quantum mechanics regards the flow of time as universal and absolute, whereas general relativity regards the flow of time as malleable and relative. This problem raises the question of what time really is in a physical sense and whether it is truly a real, distinct phenomenon. It also involves the related question of why time seems to flow in a single direction, despite the fact that no known physical laws at the microscopic level seem to require a single direction.

== Time in quantum mechanics ==
In classical mechanics, a special status is assigned to time in the sense that it is treated as a classical background parameter, external to the system itself. This special role is seen in the standard Copenhagen interpretation of quantum mechanics: all measurements of observables are made at certain instants of time and probabilities are only assigned to such measurements. Furthermore, the Hilbert space used in quantum theory relies on a complete set of observables which commute at a specific time.

== Time in general relativity ==
In general relativity time is no longer a unique background parameter, but a general coordinate. The field equations of general relativity are not parameterized by time but formulated in terms of spacetime. Many of the issues related to the problem of time exist within general relativity. At the cosmic scale, general relativity shows a closed universe with no external time. These two very different roles of time are incompatible.

== Impact on quantum gravity ==
Quantum gravity describes theories that attempt to reconcile or unify quantum mechanics and general relativity, the current theory of gravity. The problem of time is central to these theoretical attempts. It remains unclear how time is related to quantum probability, whether time is fundamental or a consequence of processes, and whether time is approximate, among other issues. Different theories try different answers to the questions but no clear solution has emerged.

== The frozen formalism problem ==
The most commonly discussed aspect of the problem of time is the frozen formalism problem. The non-relativistic equation of quantum mechanics includes time evolution:
$$i\hbar {\frac {\partial}{\partial t}} \psi (t) =H \psi (t),$$
where $H$ is an energy operator characterizing the system and the wave function $\psi (t)$ over space evolves in time, t. In general relativity the energy operator becomes a constraint in the Wheeler–DeWitt equation:
$$\hat{H}(x) |\psi\rangle = 0,$$
where the operator varies throughout space, but the wave function here, called the wave function of the universe, is constant. Consequently this cosmic universal wave function is frozen and does not evolve. Somehow, at a smaller scale, the laws of physics, including a concept of time, apply within the universe while the cosmic level is static.

== Proposed solutions to the problem of time ==
Work started by Don Page and William Wootters suggests that the universe appears to evolve for observers on the inside because of energy entanglement between an evolving system and a clock system, both within the universe. In this way the overall system can remain timeless while parts experience time via entanglement. The issue remains an open question closely related to attempted theories of quantum gravity. In other words, time is an entanglement phenomenon, which places all equal clock readings (of correctly prepared clocks – or any objects usable as clocks) into the same history.

In 2013, at the Istituto Nazionale di Ricerca Metrologica (INRIM) in Turin, Italy, Ekaterina Moreva, together with Giorgio Brida, Marco Gramegna, Vittorio Giovannetti, Lorenzo Maccone, and Marco Genovese performed the first experimental test of Page and Wootters' ideas. They confirmed for photons that time is an emergent phenomenon for internal observers of a quantum system but is absent for external observers, which is consistent with the predictions of the Wheeler–DeWitt equation.

Consistent discretizations approach developed by Jorge Pullin and Rodolfo Gambini have no constraints. These are lattice approximation techniques for quantum gravity. In the canonical approach, if one discretizes the constraints and equations of motion, the resulting discrete equations are inconsistent: they cannot be solved simultaneously. To address this problem, one uses a technique based on discretizing the action of the theory and working with the discrete equations of motion. These are automatically guaranteed to be consistent. Most of the hard conceptual questions of quantum gravity are related to the presence of constraints in the theory. Consistent discretized theories are free of these conceptual problems and can be straightforwardly quantized, providing a solution to the problem of time. It is a bit more subtle than this. Although without constraints and having "general evolution", the latter is only in terms of a discrete parameter that isn't physically accessible. The way out is addressed in a way similar to the Page–Wootters approach. The idea is to pick one of the physical variables to be a clock and ask relational questions. These ideas, where the clock is also quantum mechanical, have actually led to a new interpretation of quantum mechanics — the Montevideo interpretation of quantum mechanics. This new interpretation solves the problems of the use of environmental decoherence as a solution to the problem of measurement in quantum mechanics by invoking fundamental limitations, due to the quantum mechanical nature of clocks, in the process of measurement. These limitations are very natural in the context of generally covariant theories as quantum gravity where the clock must be taken as one of the degrees of freedom of the system itself. They have also put forward this fundamental decoherence as a way to resolve the black hole information paradox. In certain circumstances, a matter field is used to de-parametrize the theory and introduce a physical Hamiltonian. This generates physical time evolution, not a constraint.

Reduced phase-space quantization constraints are solved first and then quantized. This approach was considered for some time to be impossible, as it seems to require first finding the general solution to Einstein's equations. However, with the use of ideas involved in Dittrich's approximation scheme (built on ideas of Carlo Rovelli) a way to explicitly implement, at least in principle, a reduced phase-space quantization was made viable.

Avshalom Elitzur and Shahar Dolev argue that quantum-mechanical experiments such as the "quantum liar" provide evidence of inconsistent histories, and that spacetime itself may therefore be subject to change affecting entire histories. Elitzur and Dolev also believe that an objective passage of time and relativity can be reconciled and that it would resolve many of the issues with the block universe and the conflict between relativity and quantum mechanics.

One solution to the problem of time proposed by Lee Smolin is that there exists a "thick present" of events, in which two events in the present can be causally related to each other, but in contrast to the block-universe view of time in which all time exists eternally. Marina Cortês and Lee Smolin argue that certain classes of discrete dynamical systems demonstrate time asymmetry and irreversibility, which is consistent with an objective passage of time.

== Weyl time in scale-invariant quantum gravity ==
Motivated by the Immirzi ambiguity in loop quantum gravity and the near-conformal invariance of the standard model of elementary particles, Charles Wang and co-workers have argued that the problem of time may be related to an underlying scale invariance of gravity–matter systems. Scale invariance has also been proposed to resolve the hierarchy problem of fundamental couplings. As a global continuous symmetry, scale invariance generates a conserved Weyl current according to Noether's theorem. In scale-invariant cosmological models, this Weyl current naturally gives rise to a harmonic time. In the context of loop quantum gravity, Charles Wang et al. suggest that scale invariance may lead to the existence of a quantized time.

== Thermal time hypothesis ==
The thermal time hypothesis is a possible solution to the problem of time in classical and quantum theory as has been put forward by Carlo Rovelli and Alain Connes. They develop a statistical mechanics model of gravity and characterize thermodynamic time as a vector flow of the statistical state. This thermodynamic time has the common characteristics of time concepts.

== See also ==
- Hořava–Lifshitz gravity
- De Donder–Weyl theory
