= Top-down cosmology =

Idea of multiple histories into a complete unified theory

In theoretical physics, top-down cosmology is a proposal to regard the many possible histories of a given event as having real existence. This idea of multiple histories has been applied to cosmology, in a theoretical interpretation in which the universe has multiple possible cosmologies, and in which reasoning backwards from the current state of the universe to a quantum superposition of possible cosmic histories makes sense. Stephen Hawking argued that the principles of quantum mechanics forbid a single cosmic history, and proposed cosmological theories in which the lack of a past boundary condition naturally leads to multiple histories, the proposed Hartle–Hawking state.

According to Hawking and Thomas Hertog, "The top-down approach we have described leads to a profoundly different view of cosmology, and the relation between cause and effect. Top down cosmology is a framework in which one essentially traces the histories backwards, from a spacelike surface at the present time. The noboundary histories of the universe thus depend on what is being observed, contrary to the usual idea that the universe has a unique, observer independent history".

== See also ==
- Consistent histories
- Hartle–Hawking state
- Multiverse
- Quantum cosmology
