= Quantum cosmology =

Attempts to develop a quantum mechanical theory of cosmology

Quantum cosmology is the attempt in theoretical physics to develop a quantum theory of the universe. This approach attempts to answer open questions of classical physical cosmology, particularly those related to the first phases of the universe.

Classical cosmology is based on Albert Einstein's general theory of relativity which describes the evolution of the universe very well, as long as you do not approach the Big Bang. It is the gravitational singularity and the Planck time where relativity theory fails to provide what must be demanded of a final theory of space and time. Therefore, a theory is needed that integrates relativity theory and quantum theory. Such an approach is attempted for instance with loop quantum cosmology, loop quantum gravity, string theory and causal set theory.

In quantum cosmology, the universe is treated as a wave function instead of classical spacetime.

== See also ==
- String cosmology
- Brane cosmology
- Loop quantum cosmology
- Top-down cosmology
- Non-standard cosmology
- Loop quantum gravity
- Canonical quantum gravity
- Dark energy
- Minisuperspace
- Hamilton–Jacobi–Einstein equation
- Theory of everything
- World crystal
- Quantum vacuum state
- False vacuum
- Why is there anything at all?#Something may exist necessarily
