= Bryce DeWitt =

American theoretical physicist (1923–2004)

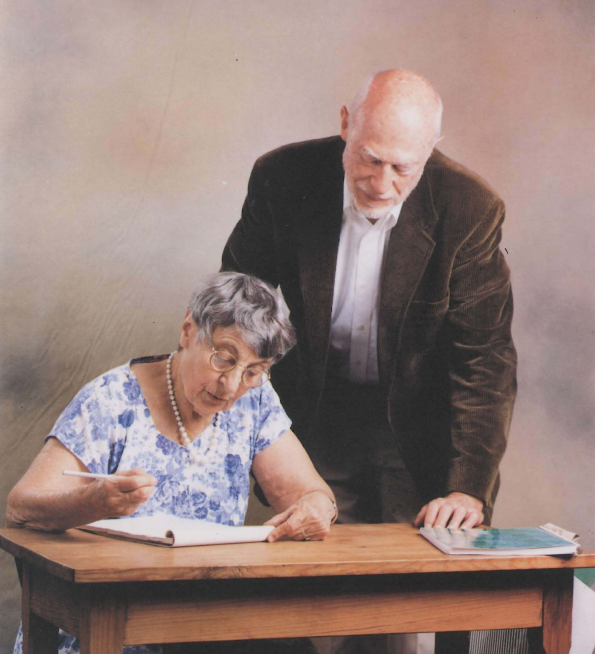
- Bryce with his wife Cécile
- Born: Carl Bryce Seligman; January 8, 1923; Dinuba, California, U.S.
- Died: September 23, 2004 (aged 81); Austin, Texas, U.S.
- Education: Harvard University (BS, MS, PhD)
- Known for: DeWitt notation; Wheeler–DeWitt equation; Canonical quantum gravity; Effective action; Numerical relativity
- Spouse: Cécile Morette (m. 1951)
- Children: 4
- Awards: Dirac Prize (1987); Pomeranchuk Prize (2002); Einstein Prize (2005)
- Scientific career
- Fields: Theoretical physics
- Workplaces: Institute for Advanced Study; University of North Carolina at Chapel Hill; University of Texas at Austin
- Doctoral advisor: Julian Schwinger
- Doctoral students: Donald Marolf; Larry Smarr; Ali Mostafazadeh

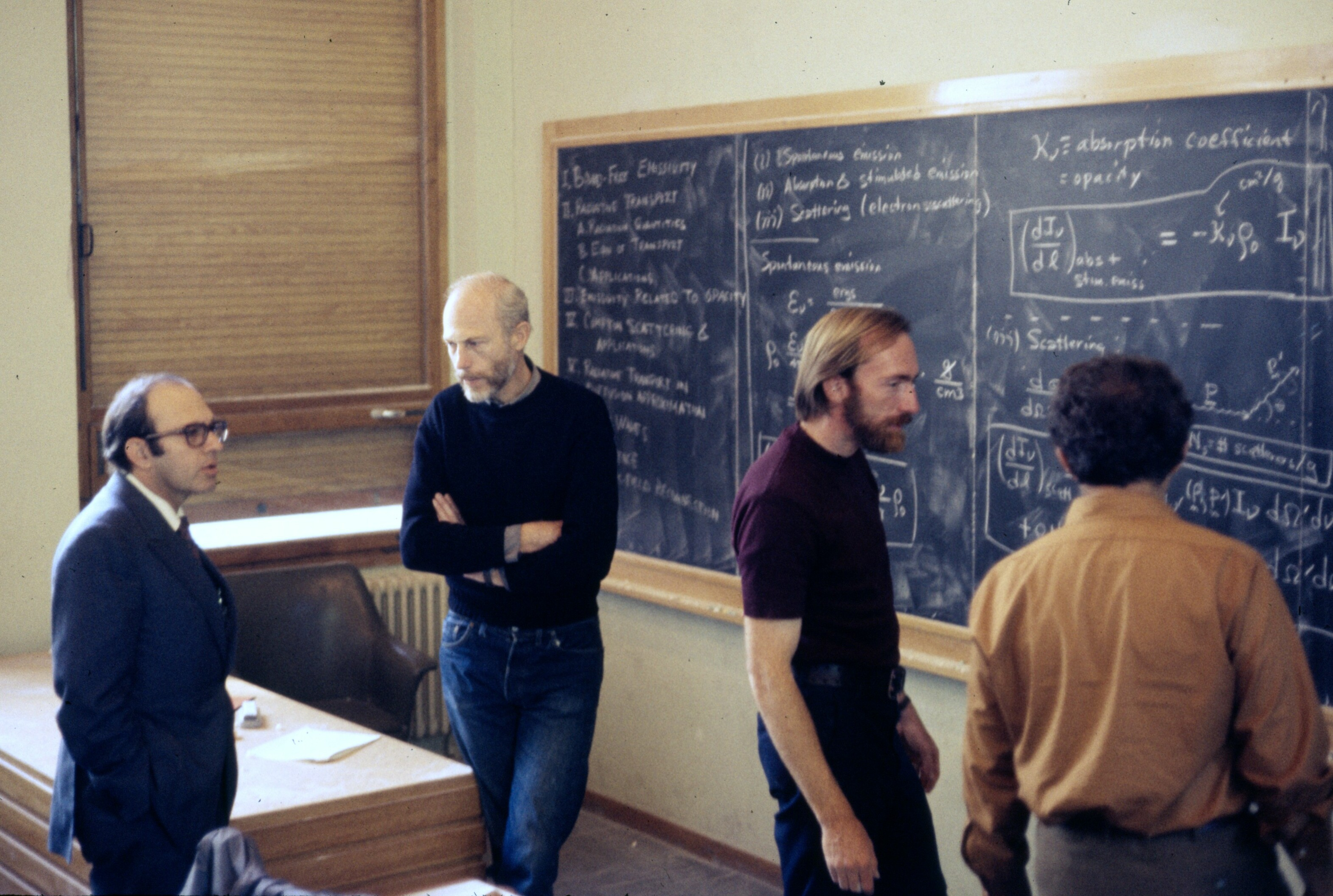
Discussion in the main lecture hall at the École de Physique des Houches (Les Houches Physics School), 1972. From left, Yuval Ne'eman, Bryce DeWitt, Kip Thorne.

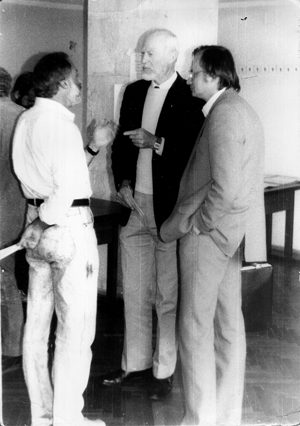
Bryce S. DeWitt (center) with Grigori A. Vilkovisky (left) and Andrei O. Barvinsky (right) at the 5th Seminar on Quantum Gravity, Moscow, May 28 – June 1, 1990

Bryce Seligman DeWitt (born Carl Bryce Seligman; January 8, 1923 – September 23, 2004) was an American theoretical physicist noted for his work in gravitation and quantum field theory.

== Personal life ==
He was born Carl Bryce Seligman, but he and his three brothers, including noted ichthyologist Hugh Hamilton DeWitt, added "DeWitt" from their mother's side of the family, at the urging of their father, in 1950. Several decades later, when Felix Bloch learned of this name change, he was so upset that he blocked DeWitt's appointment to Stanford University; consequently, DeWitt and his wife Cecile DeWitt-Morette, a mathematical physicist, accepted faculty positions at the University of Texas at Austin. DeWitt trained in World War II as a naval aviator, but the war ended before he saw combat. He died September 23, 2004, from pancreatic cancer at the age of 81. He is buried in France, and was survived by his wife and four daughters.

== Academic life ==
He received his bachelor's (summa cum laude), master's and doctoral degrees from Harvard University. His Ph.D. (1950) supervisor was Julian S. Schwinger, a Nobel Prize-winning american theoretical physicist, best known for his work on quantum electrodynamics (QED). Afterwards, DeWitt held a postdoctoral position at the Institute for Advanced Study in Princeton, New Jersey, and worked at the Lawrence Livermore Lab (1952–1955). Thereafter, he held faculty positions at the University of North Carolina at Chapel Hill (1956–1972) and, later, at the University of Texas at Austin (1973–2004).

In 1957 he and his wife organized the Chapel Hill Conference.

=== Awards ===
In 1987 he was awarded the Dirac Prize, the Pomeranchuk Prize in 2002, and, posthumously, the American Physical Society's Einstein Prize in 2005. He also was a member of the National Academy of Sciences.

=== Work ===
He pioneered work in the quantization of general relativity and, in particular, developed canonical quantum gravity, manifestly covariant methods, and heat kernel algorithms. DeWitt formulated the Wheeler–DeWitt equation for the wave function of the universe with John Archibald Wheeler and advanced the formulation of Hugh Everett's many-worlds interpretation of quantum mechanics. With his student Larry Smarr, he originated the field of numerical relativity.

== Books ==
- Bryce DeWitt, Dynamical theory of groups and fields, Gordon and Breach, New York, 1965
- Bryce DeWitt, R. Neill Graham, eds., The Many-Worlds Interpretation of Quantum Mechanics, Princeton Series in Physics, Princeton University Press (1973), ISBN 0-691-08131-X.
- S. M. Christensen, ed., Quantum theory of gravity. Essays in honor of the 60th birthday of Bryce S. DeWitt, Adam Hilger, Bristol, 1984.
- Bryce DeWitt, Supermanifolds, Cambridge University Press, Cambridge, 1985.
- Bryce DeWitt, The Global Approach to Quantum Field Theory, The International Series of Monographs on Physics, Oxford University Press, 2003, ISBN 978-0-19-851093-2.
- Bryce DeWitt, Sopra un raggio di luce, Di Renzo Editore, Roma, 2005.
- Bryce DeWitt, Bryce DeWitt's Lectures on Gravitation, Steven M. Christensen, ed., Springer, 2011.
