= Nathalie Picqué =

French molecular and laser physicist

- Born: December 2, 1973 (age 52); L’Haÿ-les-Roses, France
- Education: Paris-Saclay University; Paris-Sorbonne University; Ecole Polytechnique
- Known for: Frequency Combs
- Scientific career
- Fields: Physics
- Workplaces: Max Born Institute for Non Linear Optics and Short Pulse Spectroscopy; Humboldt University Berlin; French National Centre for Scientific Research
- Website: http://www.frequency-comb.eu

Nathalie Brigitte Anne Picqué (born December 2, 1973) is a French physicist. Picqué is the Director of the Precision Physics Division at the Max Born Institute for Nonlinear Optics and Short Pulse Spectroscopy. She also holds a joint appointment in experimental physics Professor at HU Berlin.

She is widely recognized for her pioneering work in developing broadband spectroscopy techniques using optical frequency combs. These techniques including dual-comb spectroscopy and Fourier-transform spectroscopy, have significantly pushed the limits of precision spectroscopy.

== Education and Career ==
Nathalie Picqué received a master's degree in laser physics from Paris-Sorbonne University and Ecole Polytechnique, in Paris, France. She went on to conduct her doctoral research at the Paris-Saclay University in Orsay, France in Fourier-transform spectroscopy, graduating in 1998. This was followed by a postdoctoral position at the European Laboratory for Non-Linear Spectroscopy in Florence, Italy, where she expanded on her doctoral work in frequency metrology and precision measurement with lasers. In 2001, she accepted a CNRS position and joined the Laboratoire de Photophysique Moléculaire in Orsay (now ISMO).

In 2008, she moved to the Max Planck Institute of Quantum Optics (MPQ) on a sabbatical, to work with the then-recent Nobel Laureate Theodor W. Hänsch, on dual-combs spectroscopy. Eventually, she continued as a group leader at MPQ in Garching before moving to her current position at the Max Born Institute for Non Linear Optics and Short Pulse Spectroscopy.

== Awards and honors ==
- 1999 Marie-Curie postdoctoral fellowship
- 2007 Bronze Medal of the CNRS
- 2008 Jean-Jerphagnon Prize (French Physical Society, French Optical Society, French Academy of Technologies)
- 2010 Beller Lectureship Award
- 2013 Coblentz Award
- 2019 Fellow of Optica (formerly OSA)
- 2021 Gentner-Kastler Prize (German Physical Society, French Physical Society)
- 2021 Advanced Grant (European Research Council)
- 2022 Helmholtz Prize (PTB)
- 2022 Falling Walls Science Breakthrough in Physical Sciences
- 2023: Grand Prix Cécile DeWitt-Morette / École de Physique des Houches of the French Academy of Sciences.
- 2024: William F. Meggers Award, Optica.
