= Hartle–Hawking proposal =

Proposal concerning the state of the universe prior to the Planck epoch

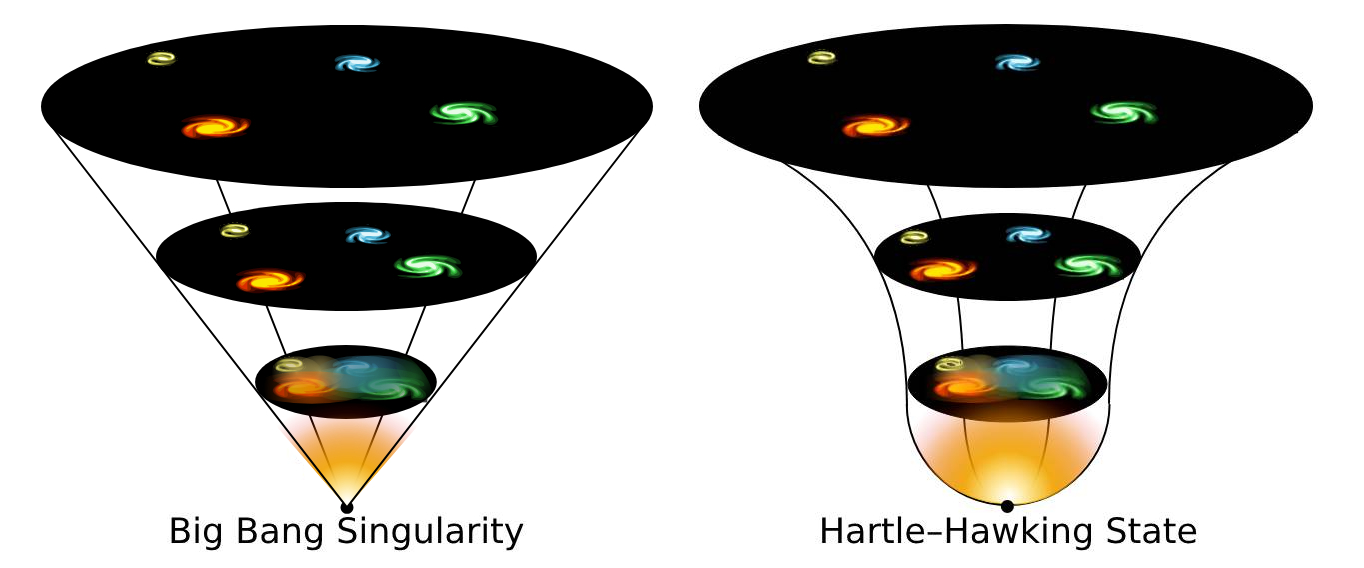
Comparison of the Big Bang concept (left) and a Hartle–Hawking state concept (right) as they are extrapolated to time zero. Diagram shows two space dimensions horizontally and one time dimension vertically.

The Hartle–Hawking state, also known as the no-boundary wave function, is a cosmological model that applies quantum mechanics to the Big Bang. It is named after James Hartle and Stephen Hawking, who first proposed it in 1983. The concept can also be considered as an initial condition for models of quantum cosmology.

== Ingredients ==
The Hartle-Hawking proposal includes several ingredients. First it uses Richard Feynman's path integral formulation of quantum mechanics. In this approach every possible path a particle can take through spacetime contributes to the solution with its own amplitude and phase. Technical challenges with those sums lead to the second ingredient, a transformation to Euclidean space-time: a geometry which combines 3 space dimensions with an imaginary time dimension. This is related to the Wick rotation, $\tau = it$, and it converts the spacetime metric into an Euclidean metric, $ds^2 = d\tau^2 + dx^2 + dy^2 + dz^2$. In Hawking's approach, this rotation is applied to every path, not to the background space of the paths as in Wick's approach, and therefore the sum of histories becomes a quantum superposition of spacetimes. This curved Euclidean spacetime can be analogous to a sphere in being both finite in extent and yet have no boundary.

== History ==
The original 1983 paper by Hartle and Hawking grew out of a summer visit by Hawking to UC Santa Barbara where Hartle worked. Hawking was exploring the idea that the boundary condition for space time was simply no-boundary at all. With Hartle this idea was converted in to a proposal and published. In 1998 Hawking worked with Neil Turok to expand the Hartle-Hawking concept to include a hyperbolic or open geometry.

== See also ==
- Imaginary time
- Multiple histories
- Signature change
