= Diffeomorphism constraint =

Constraint in diffeomorphism invariant theories

In theoretical physics, it is often important to study theories with the diffeomorphism symmetry such as general relativity. These theories are invariant under arbitrary coordinate transformations. Equations of motion are generally derived from the requirement that the action is stationary. There are special variations that are equivalent to spatial diffeomorphisms. The invariance of the action under these variations implies non-dynamical equations of motion i.e. constraints. These equations must be satisfied or, at least, they must annihilate the physical states in a quantum version of the theory.

== See also ==
- Wheeler–DeWitt equation
