= Minisuperspace =

Approximation in the study of quantum gravity phase spaces

The minisuperspace in physics, especially in theories of quantum gravity, is an approximation of the otherwise infinite-dimensional phase space of a field theory. The phase space is reduced by considering the largest wavelength modes to be of the order of the size of the universe when studying cosmological models and removing all larger modes. The validity of this approximation holds as long as the adiabatic approximation (in the sense of the adiabatic theorem) holds.

An example would be to only consider the scale factor and Hubble constant for a Friedman–Robertson–Walker model in minisuperspace model the small true vacuum bubble which is nearly spherical with one single parameter of the scalar factor a is described as minisuperspace. It plays a significant role in the explanation of the origin of universe as a bubble in quantum cosmological theory.
