= Eternal inflation =

Hypothetical inflationary universe model

In cosmology, eternal inflation is a prediction of some forms of the model of cosmic inflation, a theory developed to explain issues in the original Big Bang theory. According to eternal inflation, the decay of the meta-stable false vacuum in one region led to the inflationary phase of the universe's expansion. In surrounding regions, the false vacuum continues to expand and decay can occur in surrounding regions, resulting in other universes inaccessibly distant from ours. This process lasts forever. Eternal inflation, therefore, produces a hypothetically infinite multiverse, in which only an insignificant fractal volume ends inflation.

Paul Steinhardt, one of the original researchers of the inflationary model, introduced the first example of eternal inflation in 1983, and Alexander Vilenkin showed that it is generic.

Alan Guth's 2007 paper, "Eternal inflation and its implications", states that under reasonable assumptions "Although inflation is generically eternal into the future, it is not eternal into the past". Guth detailed what was known about the subject at the time, and demonstrated that eternal inflation was still considered the likely outcome of inflation, more than 20 years after eternal inflation was first introduced by Steinhardt.

== Overview ==
=== Development of the theory ===
Inflation, or the inflationary universe theory, was originally developed as a way to overcome the few remaining problems with what was otherwise considered a successful theory of cosmology, the Big Bang model.

In 1979, Alan Guth introduced the inflationary model of the universe to explain why the universe is flat and homogeneous (which refers to the smooth distribution of matter and radiation on a large scale). The basic idea was that the universe underwent a period of rapidly accelerating expansion a few instants after the Big Bang. He offered a mechanism for causing the inflation to begin: false vacuum energy. Guth coined the term "inflation," and was the first to discuss the theory with other scientists worldwide.

Guth's original formulation was problematic, as there was no consistent way to bring an end to the inflationary epoch and end up with the hot, isotropic, homogeneous universe observed today. Although the false vacuum could decay into empty "bubbles" of "true vacuum" that expanded at the speed of light, the empty bubbles could not coalesce to reheat the universe, because they could not keep up with the remaining inflating universe.

In 1982, this "graceful exit problem" was solved independently by Andrei Linde and by Andreas Albrecht and Paul J. Steinhardt, who showed how to end inflation without making empty bubbles and, instead, end up with a hot expanding universe. The basic idea was to have a continuous "slow-roll" or slow evolution from false vacuum to true without making any bubbles. The improved model was called "new inflation."

In 1983, Paul Steinhardt was the first to show that this "new inflation" does not have to end everywhere. Instead, it might only end in a finite patch or a hot bubble full of matter and radiation, and that inflation continues in most of the universe while producing hot bubble after hot bubble along the way. Alexander Vilenkin showed that when quantum effects are properly included, this is actually generic to all new inflation models.

Using ideas introduced by Steinhardt and Vilenkin, Andrei Linde published an alternative model of inflation in 1986 which used these ideas to provide a detailed description of what has become known as the Chaotic Inflation theory or eternal inflation.

=== Quantum fluctuations ===
New inflation does not produce a perfectly symmetric universe due to quantum fluctuations during inflation. The fluctuations cause the energy and matter density to be different at different points in space.

Quantum fluctuations in the hypothetical inflaton field produce changes in the rate of expansion that are responsible for eternal inflation. Those regions with a higher rate of inflation expand faster and dominate the universe, despite the natural tendency of inflation to end in other regions. This allows inflation to continue forever, to produce future-eternal inflation. As a simplified example, suppose that during inflation, the natural decay rate of the inflaton field is slow compared to the effect of quantum fluctuation. When a mini-universe inflates and "self-reproduces" into, say, twenty causally-disconnected mini-universes of equal size to the original mini-universe, perhaps nine of the new mini-universes will have a larger, rather than smaller, average inflaton field value than the original mini-universe, because they inflated from regions of the original mini-universe where quantum fluctuation pushed the inflaton value up more than the slow inflation decay rate brought the inflaton value down. Originally there was one mini-universe with a given inflaton value; now there are nine mini-universes that have a slightly larger inflaton value. (Of course, there are also eleven mini-universes where the inflaton value is slightly lower than it originally was.) Each mini-universe with the larger inflaton field value restarts a similar round of approximate self-reproduction within itself. (The mini-universes with lower inflaton values may also reproduce, unless its inflaton value is small enough that the region drops out of inflation and ceases self-reproduction.) This process continues indefinitely; nine high-inflaton mini-universes might become 81, then 729... Thus, there is eternal inflation.

In 1980, quantum fluctuations were suggested by Viatcheslav Mukhanov and Gennady Chibisov in the context of a model of modified gravity by Alexei Starobinsky to be possible seeds for forming galaxies.

In the context of inflation, quantum fluctuations were first analyzed at the three-week 1982 Nuffield Workshop on the Very Early Universe at Cambridge University. The average strength of the fluctuations was first calculated by four groups working separately over the course of the workshop: Stephen Hawking; Starobinsky; Guth and So-Young Pi; and James M. Bardeen, Paul Steinhardt and Michael Turner.

The early calculations derived at the Nuffield Workshop only focused on the average fluctuations, whose magnitude is too small to affect inflation. However, beginning with the examples presented by Steinhardt and Vilenkin, the same quantum physics was later shown to produce occasional large fluctuations that increase the rate of inflation and keep inflation going eternally.

=== Further developments ===
In analyzing the Planck Satellite data from 2013, Anna Ijjas and Paul Steinhardt argued that the simplest textbook inflationary models were eliminated and that the remaining models require exponentially more tuned starting conditions, more parameters to be adjusted, and less inflation. From later Planck observations (2015), the same authors confirmed their conclusions.. However, based on quantitative data analysis, these statements have been later invalidated by other authors.

A 2014 paper by Kohli and Haslam called into question the viability of the eternal inflation theory, by analyzing Linde's chaotic inflation theory in which the quantum fluctuations are modeled as Gaussian white noise. They showed that in this popular scenario, eternal inflation in fact cannot be eternal, and the random noise leads to spacetime being filled with singularities. This was demonstrated by showing that solutions to the Einstein field equations diverge in a finite time. Their paper therefore concluded that the theory of eternal inflation based on random quantum fluctuations would not be a viable theory, and the resulting existence of a multiverse is "still very much an open question that will require much deeper investigation".

== Inflation, eternal inflation, and the multiverse ==
In 1983, it was shown that inflation could be eternal, leading to a multiverse in which space is broken up into bubbles or patches whose properties differ from patch to patch spanning all physical possibilities.

Paul Steinhardt, who produced the first example of eternal inflation, eventually became a strong and vocal opponent of the theory. He argued that the multiverse represented a breakdown of the inflationary theory, because, in a multiverse, any outcome is equally possible, so inflation makes no predictions and, hence, is untestable. Consequently, he argued, inflation fails a key condition for a scientific theory.

Both Linde and Guth, however, continued to support the inflationary theory and the multiverse. Guth declared:

It's hard to build models of inflation that don't lead to a multiverse. It's not impossible, so I think there's still certainly research that needs to be done. But most models of inflation do lead to a multiverse, and evidence for inflation will be pushing us in the direction of taking the idea of a multiverse seriously.

According to Linde, "It's possible to invent models of inflation that do not allow a multiverse, but it's difficult. Every experiment that brings better credence to inflationary theory brings us much closer to hints that the multiverse is real."

In 2018 Stephen Hawking and Thomas Hertog published a paper in which the need for an infinite multiverse vanishes as Hawking says their theory gives universes which are "reasonably smooth and globally finite". The theory uses the holographic principle to define an 'exit plane' from the timeless state of eternal inflation. The universes which are generated on the plane are described using a redefinition of the no-boundary wavefunction - in fact the theory requires a boundary at the beginning of time. Stated simply Hawking says that their findings "imply a significant reduction of the multiverse" which as the University of Cambridge points out, makes the theory "predictive and testable" using gravitational wave astronomy.

== See also ==
- Astrophysics
- Fractal cosmology
- Inflation (cosmology)
- Measure problem (cosmology)
- Physical cosmology
- Shape of the universe
