= Initial singularity =

Time period of seeming infinite density just after the Big Bang

Scheme of extrapolation of a patch of universe back in time up to the point where classical physics predicts a singularity.

The initial singularity or the Big Bang singularity is a simplified model for the origin of the universe, obtained by extrapolating the Big Bang model of cosmology backward to a state of arbitrarily high density and temperature. While the Big Bang refers to the hot, dense state in the early universe from which the expansion of the universe began, extrapolating general relativity beyond this state leads to a singularity. However, this singularity is considered a breakdown of the current theoretical models, not a physically meaningful description of the universe’s origin.

== Big Bang model ==
Existing theories of physics cannot tell us about the moment of the Big Bang. Extrapolation of the expansion of the universe backwards in time using only classical general relativity yields a gravitational singularity with infinite density and temperature at a finite time in the past. However, this classical gravitational theory is expected to be inadequate to describe physics under these conditions. Thus, the meaning of this singularity in the context of the Big Bang is unclear.

=== In popular media ===
On the web and in popular science media, the Big Bang model is associated with an initial singularity. The reason seems to be simple extrapolation. Matt Strassler provides an example to illustrate why this extrapolation is illogical. Imagine extrapolating your life backwards in time: you become a child, then a baby, then a fetus. However, you don't reverse to a singularity because the process of cellular division does not extrapolate to zero size. Similarly, extrapolating the Big Bang model to zero time enters a region where the model does not apply.

=== History ===
In 1922, Alexander Friedmann derived the Friedmann equations from Albert Einstein's general relativity. He predicted an expanding universe and asked if there could be singularity in the past. Lev Landau formalized the question in 1959. Vladimir Belinski, Isaak Khalatnikov, and Evgeny Lifshitz studied solution of Einstein equations near the singularity in 1969. According to the Belinski–Khalatnikov–Lifshitz theory, the singularity is a general property of symmetrical models based on general relativity, even for large dimensional models and supergravity models. This paper indicated a chaotic dynamics near the singularity known as the Mixmaster universe, a model developed by Charles W. Misner the same year.

In 1970, Stephen Hawking and Roger Penrose developed the Penrose–Hawking singularity theorems for black holes and cosmological models, showing that the Big Bang singularity is inevitable under more general assumptions. In 2003, Arvind Borde, Alan Guth and Alexander Vilenkin considered a more general case. The Borde–Guth–Vilenkin theorem shows that a universe that expands on average is finite in the past for general f(R) gravity (more general than Einstein equations) and this result independent of the matter content of the universe. The BGV theorem however does not necessarily indicate a global singularity for all possible observers.

=== Surveys ===
According to a 2026 survey shared to 1675 members from the American Physical Society, 68% of respondents consider the Big Bang as a "hot dense state which may or may not correspond to the beginning of time", 20% consider that it corresponds to the beginning of time and it is a singularity, 5 % considered that the Big Bang was not a singularity but was the beginning of time; 4% chose the option of "other" and 3% preferred the "no opinion" option.

== Lack of quantum mechanics ==
Quantum mechanics becomes a significant factor in the high-energy environment of the earliest stage of the universe: general relativity on its own fails to make accurate predictions. In response to the inaccuracy of considering only general relativity, as in the traditional model of the Big Bang, alternative theoretical formulations for the beginning of the universe have been proposed, including a string theory-based model in which two branes, enormous membranes much larger than the universe, collided, creating mass and energy.

== Alternatives to a singularity ==
Various new models of what preceded and caused the Big Bang have been proposed as a result of the problems created by quantum mechanics. One model, using loop quantum gravity, aims to explain the beginnings of the universe through a series of Big Bounces, in which quantum fluctuations cause the universe to expand. This use of loop quantum gravity also predicts a cyclic model of universes, with a new universe being created after an old one is destroyed, each with different physical constants. These proposals have been criticized as inconsistent with the Borde–Guth–Vilenkin theorem, however their modifications with only one bounce (as opposed to cyclic series of bounces) circumvent this problem (particularly if the contracting phase is empty, i.e. compactified Milne model, and (2+1)-dimensional, due to the inherent stabilizing rigidity of vacuum in this case).

The considerable success of inflationary cosmology may make the singularity and any alternatives irrelevant for practical purposes. Inflation creates initial conditions shown to work with Big Bang models to produce agreement with astrophysical observations. It works equally well if there is a singularity, bounce, or some form of a quantum creation event.
