= Fractal cosmology =

Theory of fractal structure in the universe

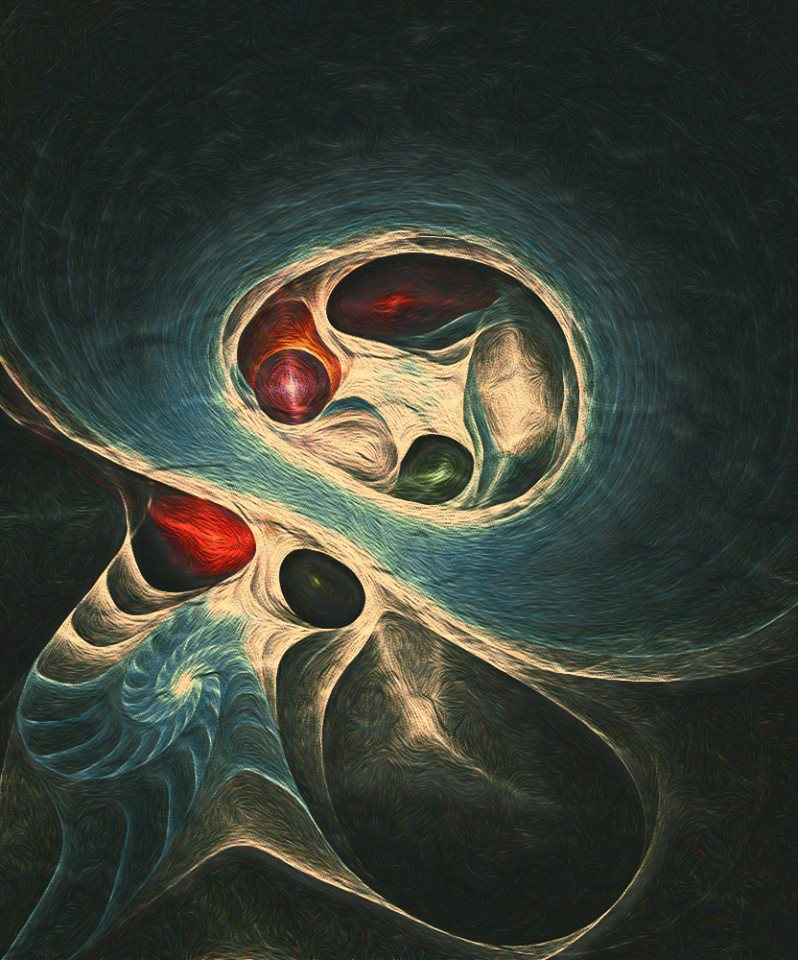
Artist's impression of a universe with fractal dimensions (Jonathan Huot)

In physical cosmology, fractal cosmology is a set of minority cosmological theories which state that the distribution of matter in the Universe, or the structure of the universe itself, is a fractal across a wide range of scales (see also: multifractal system). More generally, it relates to the usage or appearance of fractals in the study of the universe and matter. A central issue in this field is the fractal dimension of the universe or of matter distribution within it, when measured at very large or very small scales.

== Fractals in observational cosmology ==
The first attempt to model the distribution of galaxies with a fractal pattern was made by Luciano Pietronero and his team in 1987, and a more detailed view of the universe's large-scale structure emerged over the following decade, as the number of cataloged galaxies grew larger. Pietronero argues that the universe shows a definite fractal aspect over a fairly wide range of scale, with a fractal dimension of about 2. The fractal dimension of a homogeneous 3D object would be 3, and 2 for a homogeneous surface, whilst the fractal dimension for a fractal surface is between 2 and 3.

The universe has been observed to be homogeneous and isotropic (i.e. is smoothly distributed) at very large scales, as is expected in a standard Big Bang or Friedmann-Lemaître-Robertson-Walker cosmology, and in most interpretations of the Lambda-Cold Dark Matter model. The scientific consensus interpretation is that the Sloan Digital Sky Survey (SDSS) suggests that things do indeed smooth out above 100 Megaparsecs.

One study of the SDSS data in 2004 found "The power spectrum is not well-characterized by a single power law but unambiguously shows curvature ... thereby driving yet another nail into the coffin of the fractal universe hypothesis and any other models predicting a power-law power spectrum". Another analysis of luminous red galaxies (LRGs) in the SDSS data calculated the fractal dimension of galaxy distribution (on a scales from 70 to 100 Mpc/h) at 3, consistent with homogeneity, but that the fractal dimension is 2 "out to roughly 20 h^{−1} Mpc". In 2012, Scrimgeour et al. definitively showed that large-scale structure of galaxies was homogeneous beyond a scale around 70 Mpc/h.

== Fractals in theoretical cosmology ==
In the realm of theory, the first appearance of fractals in cosmology was likely with Andrei Linde's "Eternally Existing Self-Reproducing Chaotic Inflationary Universe" theory (see chaotic inflation theory) in 1986. In this theory, the evolution of a scalar field creates peaks that become nucleation points that cause inflating patches of space to develop into "bubble universes," making the universe fractal on the very largest scales. Alan Guth's 2007 paper on "Eternal Inflation and its implications" shows that this variety of inflationary universe theory is still being seriously considered today. Inflation, in some form or another, is widely considered to be our best available cosmological model.

Since 1986, quite a large number of different cosmological theories exhibiting fractal properties have been proposed. While Linde's theory shows fractality at scales likely larger than the observable universe, theories like causal dynamical triangulation and the asymptotic safety approach to quantum gravity are fractal at the opposite extreme, in the realm of the ultra-small near the Planck scale. These recent theories of quantum gravity describe a fractal structure for spacetime itself, and suggest that the dimensionality of space evolves with time. Specifically, they suggest that reality is 2D at the Planck scale, and that spacetime gradually becomes 4D at larger scales.

French mathematician Alain Connes has been working for a number of years to reconcile general relativity with quantum mechanics using noncommutative geometry. Fractality also arises in this approach to quantum gravity. An article by Alexander Hellemans in the August 2006 issue of Scientific American quotes Connes as saying that the next important step toward this goal is to "try to understand how space with fractional dimensions couples with gravitation." The work of Connes and physicist Carlo Rovelli suggests that time is an emergent property or arises naturally in this formulation, whereas in causal dynamical triangulation choosing those configurations where adjacent building blocks share the same direction in time is an essential part of the "recipe." Both approaches suggest that the fabric of space itself is fractal, however.

== See also ==
- Invariant set postulate
- Large-scale structure of the Universe
- Scale invariance
- Shape of the universe
