= Tomalla Foundation =

Swiss foundation

The Dr. Tomalla Foundation for Gravity Research promotes research into gravity in Switzerland and in the world. It was founded in 1982 according to testamentary wishes of Dr. Walter Tomalla, an engineer from Basel, Switzerland. Every third year, the foundation awards prizes for exceptional research in gravitation and/or cosmology, and funds research fellows and visitors for gravity research at Swiss universities.

== Tomalla Prize laureates ==
List of Tomalla prize laureates:

2016
Kip Thorne
2013
Scott Tremaine - for his contribution to gravitational dynamics.
2009
Viatcheslav Mukhanov - for his contributions to inflationary cosmology and especially for the determination of the density perturbation spectrum from inflation.
Alexei Starobinsky - for his pioneering contributions to inflationary cosmology and especially for the determination of the spectrum of gravitational waves generated during inflation.
2008
Demetrios Christodoulou
2003
Jim Peebles
2000
Gustav Tammann - for his efforts in measuring the expansion rate of the universe and especially for his pioneering work using Supernovae as standard candles.
1996
Werner Israel
1993
Allan Sandage
1987
Joseph Hooton Taylor, Jr.
1984
Andrei Sakharov - for his fundamental contribution to the problem of the matter - antimatter asymmetry in the Universe and his new ideas on gravity at a fundamental level (induced gravity).
1981
Subrahmanyan Chandrasekhar

== See also ==
- List of physics awards
