= Alexei Starobinsky =

Russian theoretical physicist and cosmologist (1948–2023)

- Алексей Старобинский
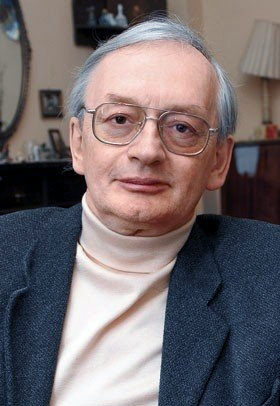
- Starobinsky in 2013
- Born: 19 April 1948; Moscow, Soviet Union
- Died: 21 December 2023 (aged 75)
- Resting place: Novodevichy Cemetery, Moscow
- Education: Moscow State University (MSc); Landau Institute for Theoretical Physics (PhD)
- Known for: Cosmic inflation
- Awards: Friedmann Prize (1996); Gruber Prize in Cosmology (2013); Kavli Prize (2014); Dirac Medal (2019)
- Scientific career
- Fields: Theoretical physics; Cosmology
- Workplaces: Landau Institute for Theoretical Physics
- Thesis: Quantum Effects and the Amplification of Waves in Strong Gravitational Forces (1975)
- Doctoral advisor: Yakov Zeldovich
- Doctoral students: Lev Abramovich Kofman; Varun Sahni

Alexei Alexandrovich Starobinsky (Russian: Алексе́й Алекса́ндрович Староби́нский; 19 April 1948 – 21 December 2023) was a Soviet and Russian theoretical physicist and cosmologist. He was a pioneer of the theory of cosmic inflation, for which he received the 2014 Kavli Prize in Astrophysics together with Alan Guth and Andrei Linde.

Born in Moscow, Starobinsky obtained a degree in physics from Moscow State University in 1972 and a doctorate in theoretical and mathematical physics from the Landau Institute for Theoretical Physics in 1975, the latter under the supervision of Yakov Zeldovich. Starobinsky remained at the Landau Institute, becoming its principal research scientist in 1997 and holding this position until his death.

While still a doctoral student, in 1973 he showed that, according to the uncertainty principle, rotating black holes must emit particles. This work led to Stephen Hawking conjecturing Hawking radiation. In 1979, he became the first to propose a model of cosmic inflation, postulating what is now known as Starobinsky inflation.

== Early life and education ==
Alexei Alexandrovich Starobinsky was born on 19 April 1948 in Moscow, in the former Soviet Union, to two radio physicists. He went to a physics and technology high school where he graduated in 1966. He attended Moscow State University, earning an MSc degree in physics in 1972. In 1975, he obtained a PhD in theoretical and mathematical physics from the Landau Institute for Theoretical Physics of the Russian Academy of Sciences under the supervision of Yakov Zeldovich with a thesis titled Quantum Effects and the Amplification of Waves in Strong Gravitational Forces.

== Career ==
After finishing his doctorate, he remained at the Landau Institute working as a research scientist. In 1997, he became the institute's principal research scientist, a position he held until his death. From 1990 to 1997, he headed the institute's department of gravitation and cosmology and, from 1999 to 2003, he was also the institute's deputy director.

Starobinsky was a visiting professor at the École Normale Supérieure in 1991, the Research Center for the Early Universe at the University of Tokyo from 2000 to 2001, the Institut Henri Poincaré in 2006, the Yukawa Institute for Theoretical Physics of Kyoto University in 1994 and 2007, and Utrecht University from 2014 to 2015. In 2017, he was also appointed as a part-time professor at the National Research University Higher School of Economics

Starobinsky held editorial positions in a number of journals including General Relativity and Gravitation from 1989 to 1997, the Journal of Experimental and Theoretical Physics from 1991, the International Journal of Modern Physics D from 1992 and the Journal of Cosmology and Astroparticle Physics from 2002. He was a member of the Board of Trustees and co-chairman of the Physics and Theology roundtable at the St Philaret's Institute.

== Research ==
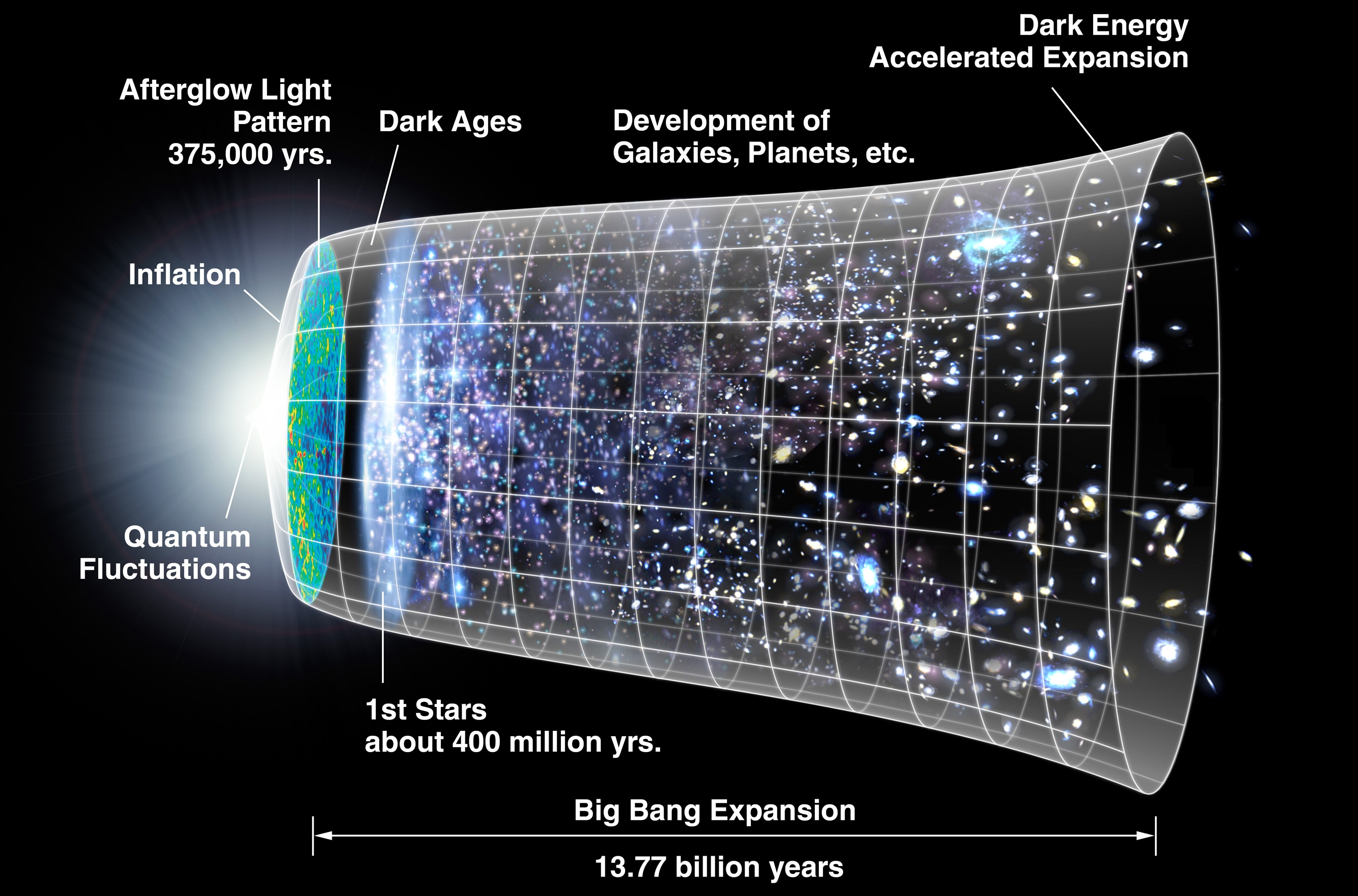
Timeline of the universe's evolution over 13.77 billion years. It is thought that the "inflationary epoch" lasted around $10^{-32}$ seconds and that during this period the universe expanded by a factor of at least $10^{25}$.

Starobinsky's research commenced while he was still a student in the early 1970s with the study of particle creation in the early universe alongside Zeldovich. In 1973, building on Zeldovich's prior research, he showed that, according to the uncertainty principle, rotating black holes must emit particles. They were visited in Moscow by Stephen Hawking, who was spurred to find a precise mathematical treatment for this phenomenon. He would later conjecture that all black holes (not just rotating ones) emit energetic particles, a theoretical effect known today as Hawking radiation. (Note: Hawking radiation has not yet been directly observed or proven experimentally. It is predicted to be incredibly faint and below the detecting ability of the current best telescopes.)

Subsequently, Starobinsky shifted his focus to cosmology. He began investigating the early universe and the Big Bang, attempting to use quantum mechanics and general relativity to understand how an expanding universe may have formed. In 1979, he became the first to propose a model for how the early universe could have gone through an extremely rapid period of exponential expansion. His model, now known as Starobinsky inflation, (Note: At the time, because the term 'inflation' had not yet been coined, the model was known just as the Starobinsky model.) postulates that the expansion was driven by quantum gravity effects. Starobinsky also found that this expansion would have produced gravitational waves detectable today as a background. Despite its significance, his work remained unknown outside of the Soviet Union. Around the same period, Alan Guth independently proposed a theory of exponential expansion, which he termed 'inflation', to tackle the horizon, flatness and magnetic monopole problems with the Big Bang. The shortcomings with Guth's theory were successfully fixed by Andrei Linde in 1981.

The Starobinsky model of inflation implied that quantum fluctuations, random disturbances of a point in space, would have been stretched beyond the quantum scale by the exponential expansion of the universe. Viatcheslav Mukhanov and Gennady Chibisov proposed that these quantum fluctuations eventually resulted in the largest structures in the universe. Their predictions have been matched by observations of the cosmic microwave background.

== Personal life and politics ==
Starobinsky's father died when he was two years old. In February 2022, he signed an open letter by Russian scientists condemning the Russian invasion of Ukraine. Starobinsky died on 21 December 2023 at the age of 75. He is buried in the Novodevichy Cemetery in Moscow.

== Honors and awards ==
Starobinsky received the Medal For Labour Valour of the Soviet Union in 1986 and the second class Order For Merit to the Fatherland in 2009.

Starobinsky was awarded the 1996 Friedmann Prize for his work on the inflationary stage of the universe and its observational manifestations. He and Mukhanov were joint recipients of the 2009 Tomalla Prize for their contributions to cosmological inflation, with Starobinsky specifically recognised for his calculations of the gravitational radiation emitted during the inflationary epoch of the universe. He received the Oskar Klein Medal in 2010. Starobinsky and Mukhanov were also co-recipients of the Amaldi Medal from the Italian Society for General Relativity and Gravitation in 2012 and the Gruber Prize in Cosmology in 2013. Together with Alan Guth of MIT and Andrei Linde of Stanford University, Starobinsky was awarded the 2014 Kavli Prize in Astrophysics by the Norwegian Academy of Science and Letters for his pioneering contributions to the theory of cosmic inflation. In 2019, he was a co-recipient of the Dirac Medal of the International Centre for Theoretical Physics together with Mukhanov and Rashid Sunyaev for his work on the cosmic microwave background. Starobinsky was awarded the Pomeranchuk Prize with Larry McLerran in 2021 and the ICGAC award in 2023 with Katushiko Sato.

Starobinsky was elected a correspondent member of the Russian Academy of Sciences in 1997 before becoming a full member in 2011. He was also an elected member of the German National Academy of Sciences Leopoldina, the Norwegian Academy of Science and Letters and the United States National Academy of Science as well as a fellow of the American Physical Society.

== Sources ==
- Ferguson, Kitty (2011). Stephen Hawking: A Life Well Lived. Bantam Press. ISBN 978-1-44-811047-6 – via Google Books.
- Gribbin, John (1996). Companion to the cosmos. Boston: Little, Brown and Company. ISBN 978-8-17-371245-6 – via Internet Archive.
- Guth, Alan (1997). The Inflationary Universe: the Quest for a New Theory of Cosmic Origins. New York: Basic Books. ISBN 978-0-20-132840-0 – via Internet Archive.
- Hawking, Stephen (March 1974). "Black hole explosions?". Nature. 248 (5443): 30–31. Bibcode:1974Natur.248...30H. doi:10.1038/248030a0.
- Mukhanov, Viatcheslav F.; Chibisov, Gennady V. (26 February 1981). "Quantum fluctuations and a nonsingular universe". Journal of Experimental and Theoretical Physics. 33 (10): 532–535 – via INSPIRE-HEP.
- Starobinsky, Alexei A. (5 December 1979). "Spectrum of relict gravitational radiation and the early state of the universe". Journal of Experimental and Theoretical Physics. 30 (11): 682–685. Archived from the original on 9 May 2014.
- Starobinsky, Alexei A.; Churilov, S. M. (February 1973). "Amplification of electromagnetic and gravitational waves scattered by a rotating "black hole"". Journal of Experimental and Theoretical Physics.
- Starobinsky, Alexei A.; Zel'dovich, Yakov B. (25 June 1971). "Particle Production and Vacuum Polarization in an Anisotropic Gravitational Field". Journal of Experimental and Theoretical Physics. 34 (6): 1159.
- White, Michael; Gribbin, John (2002). Stephen Hawking: A Life in Science (2nd ed.). National Academies Press. ISBN 978-0-309-08410-9 – via Google Books.
