= Borde–Guth–Vilenkin theorem =

Theorem in physical cosmology

The Borde–Guth–Vilenkin (BGV) theorem is a theorem in physical cosmology which deduces that any universe that has, on average, been expanding throughout its history cannot be infinite in the past but must have a past spacetime boundary. It is named after the authors Arvind Borde, Alan Guth and Alexander Vilenkin, who developed its mathematical formulation in 2003. The BGV theorem is also popularly discussed outside physics, especially in religious and philosophical debates.

== Description ==
In general relativity, the geodesics represent the paths that free-falling particles or objects follow in curved spacetime. These paths are the equivalent of the shortest path (straight lines) between two points in Euclidean space. In cosmology, a spacetime is said to be geodesically complete if all its geodesics can be extended indefinitely without encountering any singularities or boundaries. On the contrary, a spacetime that is geodesically past-incomplete features geodesics that reach a boundary or a singularity within a finite amount of proper time into the past.

In this context, we can define the average expansion rate as

$$H_{\rm av}=\frac{1}{\tau_{\rm f}-\tau_{\rm i}}\int_{t_{\rm i}}^{t_{\rm f}} H(\tau) \mathrm{d}\tau$$

where t_{i} is an initial time (τ_{i} is the proper initial time), t_{f} a final time (τ_{f} is the proper final time), and H is the expansion parameter, also called the Hubble parameter.

The BGV theorem states that for any spacetime where

$$H_{\rm av}>0$$,

then the spacetime is geodesically past-incomplete.

The theorem only applies to classical spacetime, but it does not assume any specific mass content of the universe. The theorem applies to f(R) gravity models, more general than Einstein field equations.

== Derivation ==
=== For FLRW metric ===
Here is an example of derivation of the BGV theorem for an expanding homogeneous isotropic flat universe (in units of speed of light c = 1). The derivation is consistent with the ΛCDM model, the current model of cosmology. However, this derivation can be generalized to an arbitrary space-time with no appeal to homogeneity or isotropy.

The Friedmann–Lemaître–Robertson–Walker metric is given by

$$\mathrm{d}s=\mathrm{d}t^2-a^2(t)\mathrm{d}x_i\mathrm{d}x^i$$,

where t is time, x^{i} (i=1,2,3) are the spatial coordinates and a(t) is the scale factor. Along a timeline geodesic x_{i} = constant, we can consider the universe to be filled with comoving particles. For an observer with proper time τ following the world line x^{μ}(τ), has a 4-momentum $P^\mu=m \mathrm{d}x^\mu/\mathrm{d}\tau=(E,\mathbf p)$, where $E=\sqrt{p^2+m^2}$ is the energy, m is the mass and p = |p| the magnitude of the 3-momentum.

From the geodesic equation of motion, it follows that $p(t)=p_{\rm f}\; a(t_{\rm f})/a(t)$ where p_{f} is the final momentum at time t_{f}. Thus

$$\int_{t_{\rm i}}^{t_{\rm f}} H(\tau) \mathrm{d}\tau=\int_{a(t_{\rm i})}^{a(t_{\rm f})}\frac{m}{\sqrt{m^2a^2+p^2a(t_{\rm f})}}\mathrm{d}a=F(\gamma_{\rm f})-F(\gamma_{\rm i})\leq F(\gamma_{\rm f})$$,

where $H=\dot{a}/a$ is the Hubble parameter, and

$$F(\gamma)=\frac{1}{2}\ln\left(\frac{\gamma+1}{\gamma-1}\right)$$,

γ being the Lorentz factor. For any non-comoving observer γ>1 and F(γ)>0.

Assuming $H_{\rm av}>0$ it follows that

$$\tau_{\rm f}-\tau_{\rm i} \leq \frac{F(\gamma_{\rm f})}{H_{\rm av}}$$.

Thereby any non-comoving past-directed timelike geodesic satisfying the condition $H_{\rm av}>0$, must have a finite proper length, and so must be past-incomplete.

== Implications ==
Current astronomical observations show that the universe is expanding, thus the BGV implies that there must be a boundary or singularity in the history of the universe. This singularity has often been associated to the initial singularity of the Big Bang theory. However the theorem does not tell if it is associated to any other event in the past. The theorem also does not allow to tell when the singularity takes place, or if it is a gravitational singularity or any other kind of boundary condition.

Some physical theories do not discard the possibility of a non-accelerated expansion before a certain moment in time. For example, the expansion rate could be different from $H_{\rm av}> 0$ up to the period of inflation.

The singularity predicted by the BGV theorem is also not a global singularity, it does not necessarily exist for all possible observers.

== Limitations and criticism ==
Alternative models, where the average expansion of the universe throughout its history does not hold, have been proposed under the notions of emergent spacetime, eternal inflation, and cyclic models. Vilenkin and Audrey Mithani have argued that none of these models escape the implications of the theorem. In 2017, Vilenkin stated that he does not think there are any viable cosmological models that escape the scenario.

Sean M. Carroll argues that the theorem only applies to classical spacetime, and may not hold under consideration of a complete theory of quantum gravity. He added that Alan Guth, one of the co-authors of the theorem, disagrees with Vilenkin and believes that the universe had no beginning. Vilenkin argues that the Carroll–Chen model constructed by Carroll and Jennie Chen, and supported by Guth, to elude the BGV theorem's conclusions persists to indicate a singularity in the history of the universe as it has a reversal of the arrow of time in the past.

Joseph E. Lesnefsky, Damien A. Easson and Paul Davies constructed an uncountable infinite class of classical solutions which have $H_{\rm av} \geq 0$ and are geodesically complete. The authors claim that the geodesic incompleteness of inflationary spacetime is still an open issue. In this study, the authors argue that the previous investigations often did not use mathematically precise formulations of the BGV theorem and thus reached incomplete conclusions. Furthermore, there are examples of past-infinite models solving the problem of unbounded entropy growth which are geodesically complete.

== Use in theology ==
Vilenkin has also written about the religious significance of the BGV theorem. In October 2015, Vilenkin responded to arguments made by theist William Lane Craig and the New Atheism movement regarding the existence of God. Vilenkin stated "What causes the universe to pop out of nothing? No cause is needed." Regarding the BGV theorem itself, Vilenkin told Craig: "I think you represented what I wrote about the BGV theorem in my papers and to you personally very accurately."

== See also ==
- Kalam cosmological argument
- Gibbons–Hawking–York boundary term
- Gibbons–Hawking effect
- Penrose–Hawking singularity theorems
