= The First Three Minutes =

1977 book by Steven Weinberg

The First Three Minutes: A Modern View of the Origin of the Universe
- Cover of the first edition
- Author: Steven Weinberg
- Language: English
- Subjects: Modern Physics, Cosmology, Origin of the Universe
- Publisher: Basic Books
- Publication place: United States
- English publication date: 1st ed. 1977, 2nd ed. 1993 (updated, with a major new afterword by the author)
- Media type: Print (Hardcover and Paperback)
- Pages: 224
- Awards: Science Writing Award in 1977
- ISBN: 978-0-465-02435-3

The First Three Minutes: A Modern View of the Origin of the Universe (1977; second edition 1993) is a book by American physicist and Nobel Laureate Steven Weinberg.

== Summary ==
The First Three Minutes attempts to explain the early stages of the universe after the Big Bang. Weinberg begins by recounting a creation myth from the Younger Edda and goes on to explain how, in the first half of the twentieth century, cosmologists have come to know something of the real history of the universe.

Early in the book, Weinberg explores the origins and implications of the Hubble constant, that the red shift of galaxies is proportional to their distance, and how this is evidence for the expansion of the Universe. He introduces the Cosmological Principle, that the universe is isotropic and homogeneous. He then tells the story behind the discovery of the cosmic microwave background by Arno Penzias and Robert Wilson in 1965. After giving the reader a basis of understanding of astrophysics and particle physics, in chapter 5, Weinberg lays out the makeup of the Universe after its origin in a series of frozen frames. Weinberg shows how the Big Bang can account for the relative abundance of hydrogen and helium in the universe.

In the introduction, Weinberg explains his views on writing about physics for the nonspecialist: “When a lawyer writes for the public, he assumes that they do not know Law French or the Rule Against Perpetuities, but he does not think the worse of them for that, and he does not condescend to them… I picture the reader as a smart old attorney, who does not speak my language, but who expects nonetheless to hear some convincing arguments before he makes up his mind.” The book contains a glossary and a "mathematical supplement" for readers who want to understand the mathematics behind the physics.

In the second edition, Weinberg includes "an afterword about developments in cosmology since the book's publication in 1977." In particular, he discusses the recent results from the Cosmic Background Explorer satellite, which provided further evidence for the Big Bang. He also discusses more speculative ideas like inflationary cosmology.

== Reception ==
In The New York Review of Books, Martin Gardner praised The First Three Minutes as "science writing at its best." In The New Yorker, Jeremy Bernstein wrote that "Weinberg builds such a convincing case...that one comes away from his book feeling not only that the idea of an original cosmic explosion is not crazy but that any other theory is scientifically irrational." In the acknowledgments of the first edition of A Brief History of Time, Stephen Hawking writes that prior to his book "There were already a considerable number of books about the early universe and black holes, ranging from the very good, such as Steven Weinberg's book, The First Three Minutes, to the very bad, which I will not identify." In 1995, the physicist Paul Davies wrote a book for the Science Masters series titled The Last Three Minutes, about the possible fate of the universe. After Weinberg's passing, Scientific American mentioned his "most famous (or perhaps infamous) statement can be found on the second-to-last page of his first popular book, The First Three Minutes": "The more the universe seems comprehensible, the more it also seems pointless."

== See also ==
- A Brief History of Time by Stephen Hawking
- The Inflationary Universe by Alan Guth
- Big Bang: The Origin of the Universe by Simon Singh
