= Tammann =

Tammann is the name of

- Gustav Andreas Tammann (1932–2019), cosmologist, grandson of Gustav Heinrich Johann Apollon Tammann
  - asteroid 18872 Tammann, named after the former
- Gustav Heinrich Tammann, physicist of Göttingen university
