= Starobinsky inflation =

Theoretical model of cosmic inflation

Starobinsky inflation is a modification of general relativity used to explain cosmological inflation. It was the first model to describe how the universe could have gone through an extremely rapid period of exponential expansion.

== History ==
In the Soviet Union, Alexei Starobinsky noted that quantum corrections to general relativity should be important for the early universe. These generically lead to curvature-squared corrections to the Einstein–Hilbert action and a form of quadratic gravity. The solution to the Einstein field equations in the presence of curvature squared terms, when the curvatures are large, leads to an effective cosmological constant. Therefore, he proposed that the early universe went through an inflationary de Sitter era. This resolved the cosmology problems and led to specific predictions for the corrections to the cosmic microwave background, corrections that were then calculated in detail. Starobinsky originally used the semi-classical Einstein equations with free quantum matter fields. However, it was soon realized that the late time inflation which is relevant for observable universe was essentially controlled by the contribution from a squared Ricci scalar in the effective action

$$S = \frac{1}{2\kappa} \int \left(R + \frac{R^2}{6M^2} \right) \sqrt{\vert g\vert}\,\mathrm{d}^4x,$$

where $\kappa=8\pi G/c^4$ and $R$ is the Ricci scalar. This action corresponds to the potential

$$V(\phi) = \Lambda^4 \left(1 - e^{-\sqrt{2/3} \phi/M_p} \right)^2$$

in the Einstein frame. As a result, the inflationary scenario associated to this potential or to an action including an $R^2$ term are referred to as Starobinsky inflation. To distinguish, models using the original, more complete, quantum effective action are then called (trace)-anomaly induced inflation.

== Observables ==
Starobinsky inflation gives a prediction for primordial observables, e.g., the spectral tilt $n_s$ and the tensor-scalar ratio $r$: $n_s \approx 1 - \frac{2}{N}, \quad r \approx \frac{12}{N^2},$ where $N_\ast$ is the number of e-foldings since the horizon crossing. As $50<N_\ast<60$, these are compatible with experimental data, with 2018 CMB data from the Planck satellite giving a constraint of $r<0.064$ (95% confidence) and $n_s=0.9649\pm 0.0042$ (68% confidence). The model also gives precise predictions to higher order observables, such as a negative running for the scalar spectral tilt: $\alpha_s \approx -\frac{1}{2} (n_s-1)^2 + \frac{5}{48} (n_s-1)^3$, and a negative tensor tilt: $n_t \approx -\frac{3}{8}(n_s-1)^2 + \frac{5}{16} (n_s-1)^3$.

== See also ==
- Alternatives to general relativity
- Inflation (cosmology)
