= QG =

QG or qg may refer to:

== Science and technology ==
- Quantum gravity, a theory in physics that aims to unify general relativity and quantum mechanics
  - Quadratic gravity, a particular theory of quantum gravity
- Quasigeostrophic, an atmospheric dynamics theory; see Geostrophic wind
- Quadrature Generator; see quadrature amplitude modulation
- Nissan QG engine, an automotive engine series
- ATCvet code QG, Genito-urinary system and sex hormones, a section of the Anatomical Therapeutic Chemical Classification System for veterinary medicinal products
- quod google (q.g.), an internet variation on Latin reference quod vide to indicate further information available

== Other uses ==
- Quetta Gladiators, a cricket team franchise in Pakistan Super League
- Queen's Gambit, a chess opening move
- Citilink, an IATA airline code
