= Graceful exit problem =

Concept in physical cosmology

In physical cosmology, the graceful exit problem refers to an inherent flaw in the initial proposal of the inflationary universe theory proposed by Alan Guth in 1981.

In Guth's model, the period of accelerated expansion (a.k.a. inflation) makes the universe homogeneous and flat but can never end. The problem with that model, later referred to as "old inflation," is that an energy barrier prevents the universe from escaping inflation, blocking the universe from reheating and forming the stars and galaxies observed today.

In 1982, a solution to the graceful exit problem was found independently by Andrei Linde and the team of Andreas Albrecht and Paul J. Steinhardt. The new model, subsequently referred to as "new inflation," replaced the energy barrier with an "energy plateau" so that inflation takes place for a period but stops once the plateau is traversed.

The Albrecht–Steinhardt paper also revealed an important gravitational effect known as "Hubble friction," which helps sustain inflation for a sufficiently long period of time (referred to as the "slow-roll" effect).

In 1983, James Bardeen, Steinhardt and Michael S. Turner showed that Hubble friction is essential for generating a spectrum of density fluctuations at the end of inflation that could explain the origin of galaxies and the temperature variations in the cosmic microwave background.

Most subsequent inflationary models solve the graceful exit problem using similar principles.
