= Cold inflation =

Cold inflation may refer to:

- Cold inflation pressure, the pressure in tires before they are warmed up by the car's motion;
- One of the two dynamical realizations of cosmological inflation the other being warm inflation.
