= Quadratic gravity =

Theory extending Einstein gravity

Quadratic gravity (QG) is an extension of general relativity obtained by adding all local quadratic-in-curvature terms to the Einstein–Hilbert Lagrangian. Doing this makes the theory renormalizable. This is one of numerous alternatives to general relativity. It has been suggested that consistency with quantum chromodynamics requires these additional quadratic terms.

The theory was originally proved to be renormalizable by Kellogg Stelle in 1977, but had difficulty being accepted as a viable theory because of its introduction of a massive spin-2 ghost particle. Aside from the massive ghost, the theory also predicts the existence of an additional scalar boson and the massless graviton, ensuring that general relativity is recovered at low energies. The additional scalar particle appears also in Alexei Starobinsky's work of 1980 on the early universe. In Starobinsky inflation, the scalar particle is responsible for cosmic inflation.

QG, besides being renormalizable, has also been shown to feature a non-perturbative ultraviolet fixed point. Unitarity, essential to a theory of quantum gravity, has been established in appropriate constructions, where the appropriate inner product to compute probabilities through the Born rule is constructed. In scattering processes the unitarity of the S-matrix has been proved using the instability of the massive spin-2 particle.

The relevant solutions are not unstable but metastable: when the energies are much below a threshold (that is high enough to describe the whole cosmology) runaways are avoided and the possible instability occurring when the bound is violated not only is compatible with cosmology but would also explain why we live in a homogeneous and isotropic universe.

John Donoghue believes quadratic gravity could be a viable theory of quantum gravity. He has reinterpreted its ghost particles as time-reversed unstable particles.

Work has been directed towards using the Event Horizon Telescope to test for the possibility of QG being a valid theory.
