= Oskar Klein Memorial Lecture & Oscar Klein Medal =

Lecture at Stockholm University, Sweden in Memory of Oskar Klein

The Oskar Klein Memorial Lecture at Stockholm University, dedicated to the memory of the Swedish physicist Oskar Klein (1894-1977), is held annually since 1988 by a prominent physicist, who also receives the Oskar Klein Medal. The lecture is sponsored by the university and the Nobel Committee of the Royal Swedish Academy of Sciences.

== List of lecturers and recipients of the Medal ==
- 2026 - Ashoke Sen
- 2024 - Renata Kallosh
- 2023 - Alessandra Buonanno
- 2022 - Igor R. Klebanov
- 2020 - Roy Kerr
- 2019 - Lisa Randall
- 2018 - Leonard Susskind
- 2017 - Sheldon Glashow
- 2016 - Kip S. Thorne
- 2015 - Rashid Sunyaev
- 2014 - Andrew Strominger
- 2013 - Frank Wilczek
- 2012 - Juan Maldacena
- 2011 - Joseph Silk
- 2010 - Alexei A. Starobinsky
- 2009 - Peter Higgs
- 2008 - Helen Quinn
- 2007 - Gabriele Veneziano
- 2006 - Viatcheslav Mukhanov
- 2005 - Yoichiro Nambu
- 2004 - Pierre Ramond
- 2003 - Stephen Hawking
- 2002 - Martin Rees
- 2001 - Andrei Linde
- 2000 - David Gross
- 1999 - Gerard 't Hooft
- 1998 - Edward Witten
- 1997 - P. J. E. Peebles
- 1996 - Alexander Polyakov
- 1995 - Nathan Seiberg
- 1994 - The Oskar Klein Centenary Symposium, September 19-21, 1994
- 1993 - Tsung-Dao Lee
- 1992 - John A. Wheeler
- 1991 - Alan Guth
- 1990 - Hans Bethe
- 1989 - Steven Weinberg
- 1988 - Chen Ning Yang

== See also ==
- Lise Meitner Distinguished Lecture
- List of physics awards
