= Alexander Vilenkin =

Cosmologist

- Олександр Віленкін
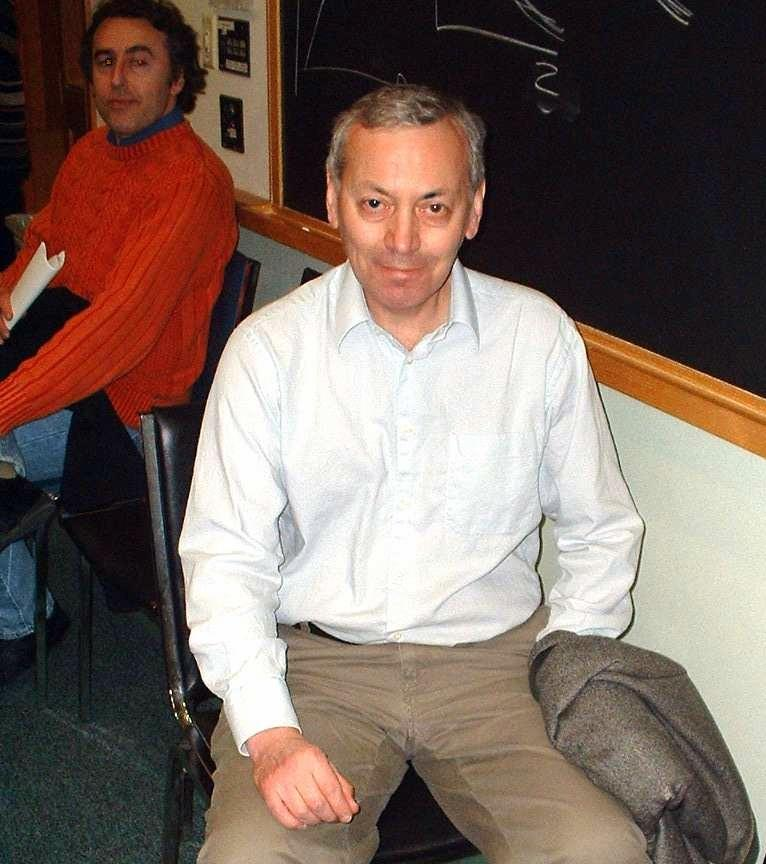
- Vilenkin at Harvard University, 2005
- Born: May 13, 1949 (age 77); Kharkiv, Ukrainian SSR, Soviet Union
- Education: University at Buffalo
- Known for: Eternal inflation Borde–Guth–Vilenkin theorem Cosmic strings
- Scientific career
- Fields: Physical cosmology
- Workplaces: Tufts University

Alexander Vilenkin (Russian: Алекса́ндр Владимирович Виле́нкин; Ukrainian: Олександр Віленкін; born 13 May 1949) is the Leonard Jane Holmes Bernstein Professor of Evolutionary Science and Director of the Institute of Cosmology at Tufts University. A theoretical physicist who has been working in the field of cosmology for 25 years, Vilenkin has written over 260 publications.

== Biography ==
As an undergraduate studying physics at the University of Kharkiv, Vilenkin turned down collaborator offer from the KGB, causing him to be blacklisted from pursuing a graduate degree. Then he was drafted into a building brigade and later worked at the state zoo as a night watchman while conducting physics research in his spare time.

In 1976, Vilenkin immigrated to the United States as a Jewish refugee, obtaining his Ph.D. at SUNY Buffalo. His work has been featured in numerous newspaper and magazine articles in the United States, Europe, Soviet Union, and Japan, and in many popular books.

Vilenkin is the father of writer and musician Alina Simone.

== Work ==
In 1982, Paul Steinhardt presented the first model of eternal inflation, Vilenkin showed that eternal inflation is generic. Furthermore, working with Arvind Borde and Alan Guth, he developed the Borde–Guth–Vilenkin theorem, showing that a period of inflation must have a beginning and that a period of time must precede it. This represents a problem for the theory of inflation because, without a theory to explain conditions before inflation, it is not possible to determine how likely it is for inflation to have occurred.

He also further developed Edward P. Tryon's idea of quantum creation of the universe from a quantum vacuum.

He was elected a Fellow of the American Physical Society in 1989 "for pioneering research in the application of particle physics to cosmology, and in particular for seminal contributions in the areas of cosmic strings and quantum cosmology".

== Books ==
- Many Worlds in One: The Search for Other Universes A. Vilenkin (Macmillan, July 2006)
- Cosmic Strings and Other Topological Defects by A. Vilenkin, E. P. S. Shellard (paperback – July 31, 2000)
