= Warm inflation =

Dynamical realization of cosmic inflation

In physical cosmology, warm inflation is one of two dynamical realizations of cosmological inflation. The other is the standard scenario, sometimes called cold inflation.

In warm inflation radiation production occurs concurrently with inflationary expansion. This is consistent with the conditions necessary for inflation as given by the Friedmann equations of general relativity, which simply require that the vacuum energy density dominates the energy content of the universe at time of inflation, and so does not prohibit some radiation to be present. As such the most general picture of inflation would include a radiation energy density component. The presence of radiation during inflation implies the inflationary phase could smoothly end into a radiation-dominated era without a distinctively separate reheating phase, thus providing a solution to the graceful exit problem of inflation.
