= The Inflationary Universe =

Book by Alan Guth

The Inflationary Universe: The Quest for a New Theory of Cosmic Origins
- Softcover edition
- Author: Alan Guth
- Cover artist: Suzanne Heiser
- Language: English
- Subject: Physics, cosmology
- Genre: Non-fiction
- Published: 1997 (Perseus Books)
- Publication place: United States
- Pages: 358
- ISBN: 0201328402
- OCLC: 41615809
- Dewey Decimal: 523.1/8
- LC Class: QB991.I54

The Inflationary Universe is a popular physics book by theoretical physicist Alan H. Guth, first published in 1997. The book explores the historical and theoretical development and expansion of the theory of inflation, which was first presented by the author in 1979 as the culmination of his research on the implications of theory of the Big Bang.

The book's blurb referred to it as "the passionate story of one leading scientist's effort to look behind the cosmic veil and explain how the universe began".

== Reception ==
The book was generally well-received upon release, with critics noting the toned down use of complex mathematics in favor of featuring its explanations through diagrams and analogies instead. Marcus Chown of New Scientist contemporaneously criticized the rate at which "[t]echnical terms are tossed about[...] making the book tough going for anyone not familiar with the basic lexicon of physics". Despite its perceived nonlinearity, he nevertheless praised the title and recommended it for the scientific relevance, deeming the book's core "arguably the most significant new development in cosmology for half a century" should the model prove true. It was similarly praised by The New York Times Book Review, the San Francisco Examiner, Science, and The Washington Post Book World.

In April 2015, physicist and Nobel laureate Steven Weinberg included The Inflationary Universe in a personal list of "the 13 best science books for the general reader".

== See also ==
- The First Three Minutes
