= Journal of Experimental and Theoretical Physics =

- Discipline: Experimental and theoretical physics
- Language: Russian, English
- Edited by: Alexander F. Andreev

Publication details
- Publisher: Maik Nauka/Interperiodica (Russia)
- Frequency: Monthly
- Impact factor: 1.1 (2022)

Standard abbreviations
- ISO 4: J. Exp. Theor. Phys.

Indexing
- CODEN: JTPHES
- ISSN: 1063-7761 (print); 1090-6509 (web)
- LCCN: 93641528
- OCLC no.: 230707316

Links
- Journal homepage; Springer homepage

The Journal of Experimental and Theoretical Physics (JETP) [Russian: Журнал Экспериментальной и Теоретической Физики (ЖЭТФ), or Zhurnal Éksperimental'noĭ i Teoreticheskoĭ Fiziki (ZhÉTF)] is a peer-reviewed Russian bilingual scientific journal covering all areas of experimental and theoretical physics. For example, coverage includes solid-state physics, elementary particles, and cosmology. The journal is published simultaneously in both Russian and English languages. The previous editor-in-chief was Alexander F. Andreev, today the editor-in-chief is Alexander Ivanovich Smirnov. In addition, this journal is a continuation of Soviet physics, JETP (1931–1992), which began English translation in 1955.

== Indexing ==
JETP is indexed in:

- Academic OneFile
- Academic Search
- Chemical Abstracts Service
- Compendex
- Current Abstracts
- Current Contents/Physical, Chemical and Earth Sciences
- Current Mathematical Publications
- Digital Mathematics Registry
- Gale
- Google Scholar
- INIS Atomindex
- Journal Citation Reports/Science Edition
- OCLC
- Science & Technology Collection
- Science Citation Index
- Science Citation Index Expanded (SciSearch)
- SCOPUS
- Summon by Serial Solutions
- TOC Premier
