= Gennady Chibisov =

Russian Cosmologist

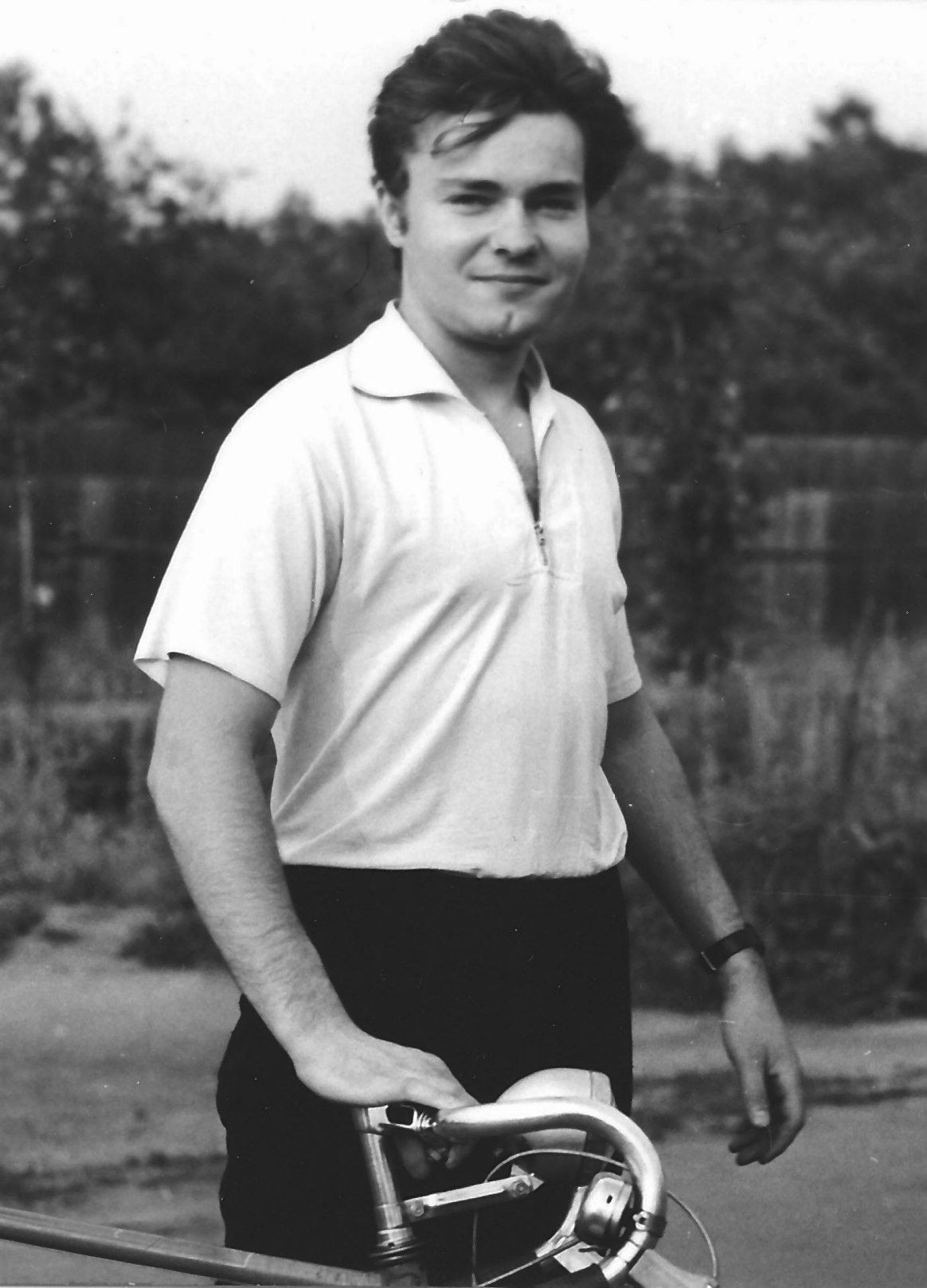
- The Soviet Cosmologist Gennady Chibisov (1946-2008).
- Born: September 23, 1946; Moscow, Soviet Union
- Died: August 7, 2008 (aged 61)
- Education: Moscow Institute of Physics and Technology
- Known for: Calculating the origin of cosmological density perturbations from quantum fluctuations
- Scientific career
- Fields: Cosmology
- Workplaces: Lebedev Institute, Moscow

Gennady Chibisov (Russian: Геннадий Чибисов; September 23, 1946 – August 7, 2008) was a Soviet/Russian cosmologist. He obtained his PhD in 1972, from the Moscow Institute of Physics and Technology, with a thesis entitled "Entropy perturbations in cosmology". He is best known for his 1981 paper on the origin of cosmological density perturbations from quantum fluctuations, coauthored with Viatcheslav Mukhanov. This is the earliest of a number of calculations addressing the origin of density fluctuations in inflationary cosmology, which is the most common hypothesis for the origin of the expanding universe and the structure within it. The Mukhanov-Chibisov paper was part of the work honoured by the 2013 Gruber Prize in Cosmology.

== Publications ==
- Mukhanov, Viatcheslav; Chibisov, Gennady (2003). "CMB, Quantum Fluctuations and the Predictive Power of Inflation". arXiv:astro-ph/0303077. Bibcode:2003astro.ph..3077M.

== See also ==
- Lebedev institute, Moscow
