= Gustav Andreas Tammann =

German astronomer (1932–2019)

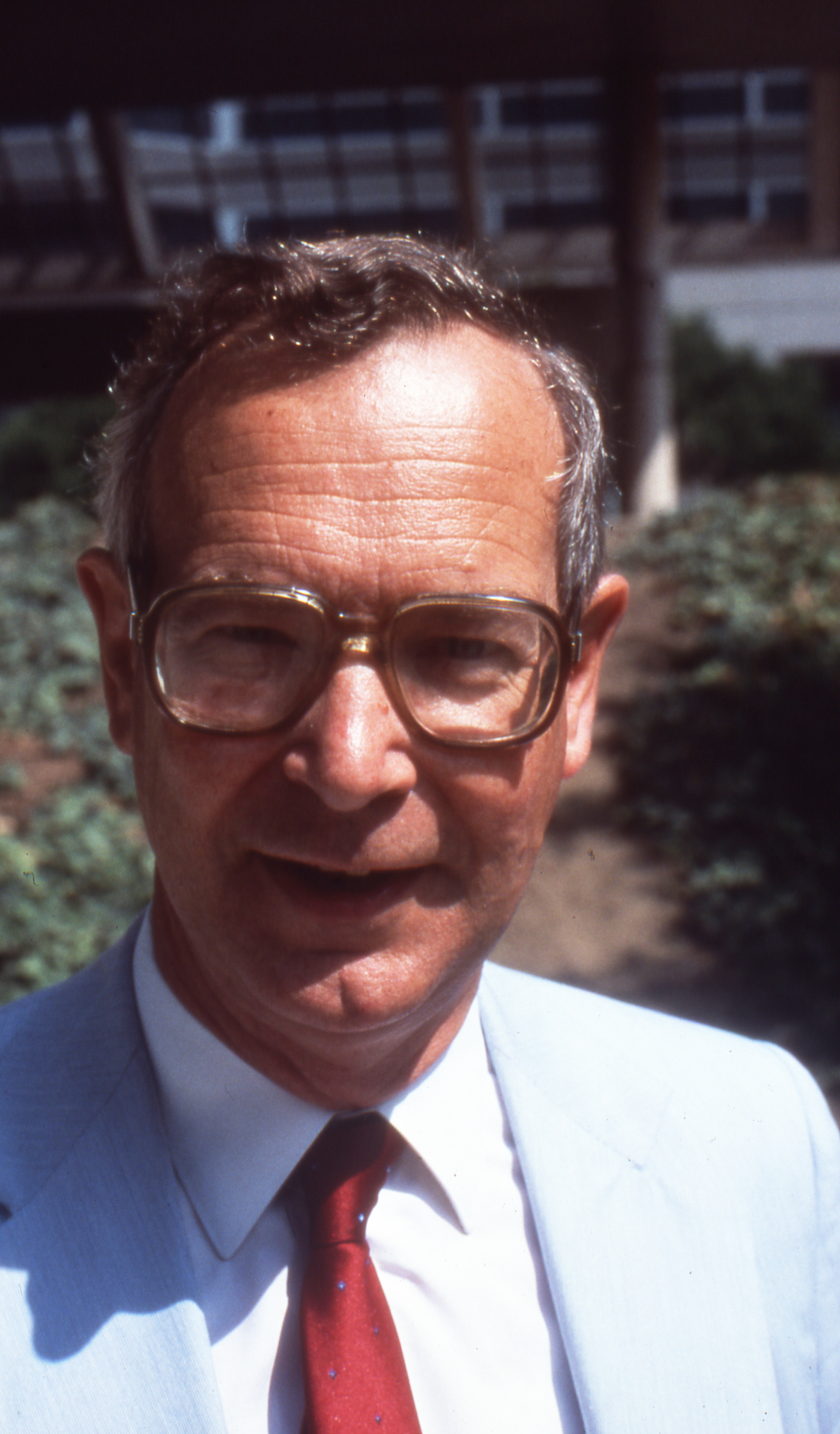
- Tammann in 1988
- Born: 24 July 1932; Göttingen, Germany
- Died: 6 January 2019 (aged 86)
- Education: University of Basel, University of Göttingen
- Relatives: Gustav Heinrich Tammann (grandfather)
- Awards: Albert Einstein Medal, Karl Schwarzschild Medal, Tomalla Prize
- Scientific career
- Fields: Astronomy
- Workplaces: University of Hamburg, University of Basel

Gustav Andreas Tammann (24 July 1932 – 6 January 2019) was a Swiss astronomer and academic. He served as director of the Astronomical Institute of the University of Basel; as a member of the European Space Agency Space Telescope Advisory Team, and as Member of Council of the European Southern Observatory. His research interests included supernovae and the extragalactic distance scale. Tammann was a former President of the International Astronomical Union Commission on Galaxies.

Tammann is the grandson of chemist-physicist Gustav Heinrich Tammann.

== Education and early career ==
Tammann studied astronomy in Basel, Switzerland and Göttingen, Germany. In 1963 he began a longtime working relationship with Allan Sandage at the Mount Wilson and Palomar observatories.

== Academic career ==
In 1972, he became a professor at the University of Hamburg. From 1977 until his retirement, he was a professor and head of the Astronomical Institute at the University of Basel.

His work focused mainly on the determination of the Hubble constant as well as the use of supernovae as cosmic distance indicators.

== Accolades ==
In 1991 Tammann became a full member of Academia Europaea, and in 1993 became a corresponding member of the Heidelberg Academy of Sciences and Humanities. In 2000 he received the Albert Einstein Medal that is given for "outstanding scientific findings, works, or publications related to Albert Einstein" and the Tomalla Prize for his efforts in measuring the expansion rate of the universe and especially for his pioneering work using Supernovae as standard candles. In 2005 he received the Karl Schwarzschild Medal.

The asteroid 18872 Tammann was named for him in 2001.

== Publications ==
- Halleys Komet (1985)
