= Journal of Cosmology and Astroparticle Physics =

- Discipline: Cosmology, Astroparticle physics
- Language: English
- Edited by: Viatcheslav Mukhanov

Publication details
- History: 2003–present
- Publisher: IOP Publishing/SISSA (United Kingdom/Italy)
- Open access: Hybrid
- Impact factor: 5.3 (2023)

Standard abbreviations
- ISO 4: J. Cosmol. Astropart. Phys.

Indexing
- CODEN: JCAPBP
- ISSN: 1475-7516
- OCLC no.: 51830717

Links
- Journal homepage

The Journal of Cosmology and Astroparticle Physics is an online-only peer-reviewed scientific journal focusing on all aspects of cosmology and astroparticle physics. This encompasses theory, observation, experiment, computation and simulation. It has been published jointly by IOP Publishing and the International School for Advanced Studies since 2003. Journal of Cosmology and Astroparticle Physics has been a part of the SCOAP^{3} initiative. But from 1 January 2017, it has moved out from SCOAP^{3} agreement.

== Abstracting and indexing ==
Journal of Cosmology and Astroparticle Physics is indexed and abstracted in the following databases:

- Astrophysics Data System
- Chemical Abstracts Service
- Current Contents/Engineering, Computing and Technology
- Current Contents/Physical, Chemical and Earth Sciences
- GEOBASE
- Inspec
- MathSciNet
- Science Citation Index Expanded
- Scopus
- VINITI Abstracts Journal (Referativnyi Zhurnal)
- Zentralblatt MATH
