= James M. Bardeen =

American physicist (1939–2022)

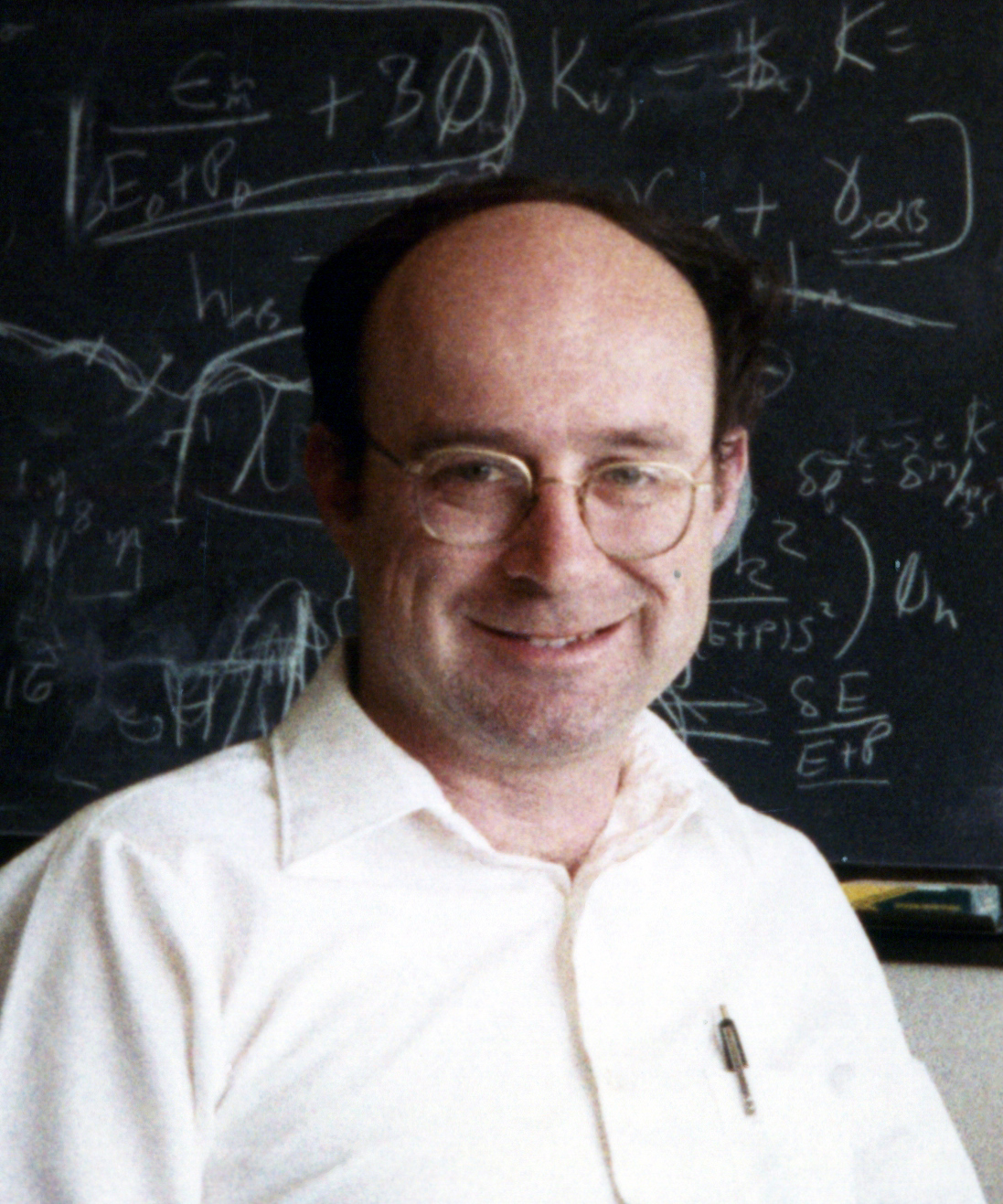
- Bardeen in 1980
- Born: James Maxwell Bardeen; May 9, 1939; Minneapolis, Minnesota, U.S.
- Died: June 20, 2022 (aged 83); Seattle, Washington, U.S.
- Education: Harvard University (BS); California Institute of Technology (PhD)
- Known for: Laws of black hole thermodynamics
- Scientific career
- Fields: Physics
- Institutions: University of Washington; Perimeter Institute
- Thesis: Stability and Dynamics of Spherically Symmetric Masses in General Relativity (1965)
- Doctoral advisor: Richard Feynman; William A. Fowler

James Maxwell Bardeen (May 9, 1939 – June 20, 2022) was an American physicist. He worked on general relativity, particularly in formulating the laws of black hole mechanics. He also discovered the Bardeen vacuum, an exact solution of the Einstein field equation.

== Early life and education ==
Bardeen was born in Minneapolis, Minnesota, on May 9, 1939. His father, John Bardeen, won the Nobel Prize in Physics twice for inventing the transistor and formulating the theory of superconductivity; his mother, Jane Maxwell Bardeen, worked as a zoologist and a high school teacher. During his childhood, Bardeen resided in Washington, D.C., Summit, New Jersey, and Chicago as part of his father's employment. He attended the University Laboratory High School in Urbana, Illinois. He then studied physics at Harvard University, even though his father wanted him to go into biology. After graduating in 1960, he undertook graduate studies at the California Institute of Technology under the direction of Richard Feynman and William Alfred Fowler. Bardeen was awarded a Doctor of Philosophy in 1965.

== Career ==
Bardeen first worked at Caltech and the University of California, Berkeley, in postdoctoral positions. He became a part of the astronomy department of the University of Washington in 1967. He subsequently joined Yale University in 1972. That same year, he co-authored the watershed paper "The Four Laws of Black Hole Mechanics" with Stephen Hawking and Brandon Carter during a meeting held at the École de physique des Houches. Later that year, Bardeen theorized the doughnut shape and size of a black hole’s shadow, which was later confirmed by the observations of M87* by the Event Horizon Telescope.

Bardeen returned to the University of Washington in 1976, remaining there until his retirement in 2006. Together with Michael S. Turner and Paul Steinhardt, he published a paper in 1982 detailing the way submicroscopic fluctuations in the density of matter and energy in the early universe would bring about the arrangement of galaxies seen in the present day. Bardeen was also a distinguished visiting research fellow at Perimeter Institute for Theoretical Physics. In 2012, he was elected to the U.S. National Academy of Sciences.

== Personal life ==
Bardeen married Nancy Thomas in 1968. They met the year before in Paris while he was attending a conference, and remained married until his death. Together, they had two children, William and David.

Bardeen's brother, William A. Bardeen, was also a physicist. His sister, Elizabeth, was married to Thomas Greytak, a physicist at MIT. In a 2020 interview given to Federal University of Pará in Brazil, Bardeen recalls his journey as a physicist, his father's influences on him, his experiences as a doctoral student of Richard Feynman, and working with Stephen Hawking.

Bardeen died on June 20, 2022, at a retirement home in Seattle. He was 83, and suffered from cancer prior to his death.

== See also ==
- Bardeen–Petterson effect
- Cosmological perturbation theory
- Post-Newtonian expansion
