= Viatcheslav Mukhanov =

German cosmologist and theoretical physicist (born 1952)

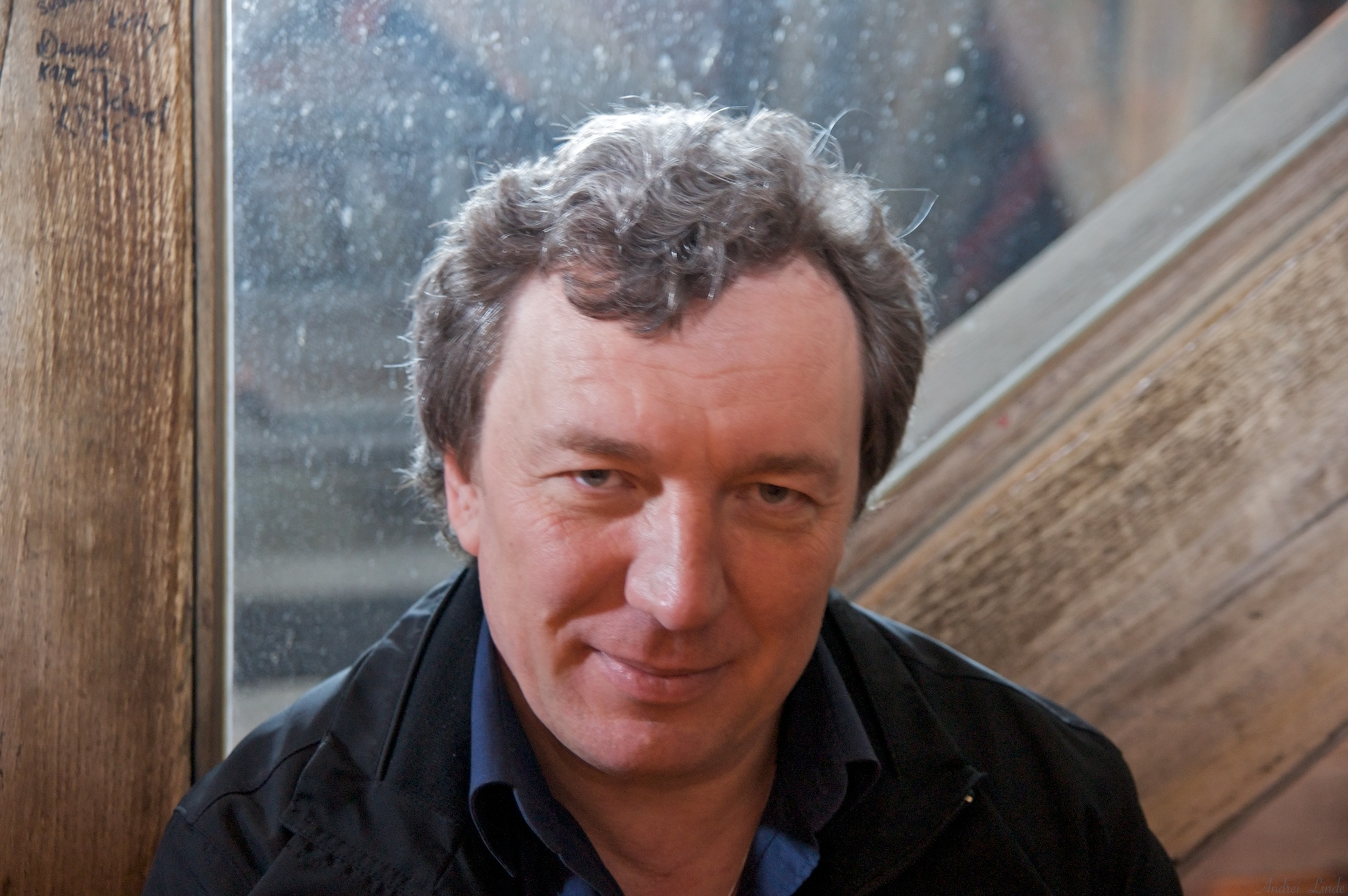
- Born: 2 October 1956 (age 69); Kanash, Chuvash ASSR, Russian SFSR
- Education: Moscow Institute of Physics and Technology
- Known for: Predicting quantum origin of the Universe structure
- Awards: Gold Medal of the Academy of Sciences of the USSR, USSR (1988); Oskar Klein Medal, Stockholm University, Sweden (2006); Tomalla Prize, Switzerland (2009); Blaise Pascal Chair, ENS, Paris, France (2011); Amaldi Medal (2012); Gruber Prize in Cosmology (2013); Max Planck Medal (2015); BBVA Foundation Frontiers of Knowledge Award (2015); Dirac Medal, (ICTP) (2019)
- Scientific career
- Fields: Cosmology, Theoretical physics
- Workplaces: LMU Munich
- Doctoral advisor: Vitaly Ginzburg

Viatcheslav Fyodorovich Mukhanov (Russian: Вячесла́в Фёдорович Муха́нов; born October 2, 1956) is a Soviet/Russian born German theoretical physicist and cosmologist. He is best known for the theory of Quantum Origin of the Universe Structure. Working in 1980 and 1981 with Gennady Chibisov in the Lebedev Physical Institute in Moscow, he predicted the spectrum of inhomogeneities in the Universe, which are originated from the initial quantum fluctuations. The numerous experiments in which there were measured the temperature fluctuations of the Cosmic Microwave Background Radiation are in excellent agreement with this theoretical prediction, thus confirming that the galaxies and their clusters originated from the initial quantum fluctuations. Later on, Mukhanov proved that the results he obtained with G. Chibisov in 1981 are of the generic origin, and he has developed the general consistent quantum cosmological perturbation theory.

Since 2006, Mukhanov is the Scientific Director of the Journal of Cosmology and Astroparticle Physics.

== Awards ==
- Gold Medal of the Academy of Sciences of the USSR, USSR (1988),
- Oskar Klein Medal, Stockholm University, Sweden (2006),
- Tomalla prize, Switzerland (2009)
- Blaise Pascal Chair, ENS, Paris, France (2011)
- Amaldi Medal (2012)
- Gruber Prize in Cosmology (2013)
- Friedrich Wilhelm Joseph von Schelling-Preis, Bavarian Academy of Sciences and Humanities, Germany (2014)
- Max Planck Medal (2015)
- BBVA Foundation Frontiers of Knowledge Award (2015) in Basic Sciences
- Dirac Medal, (ICTP) (2019)

== Publications ==
- Mukhanov, Viatcheslav and Chibisov Gennady: "Quantum fluctuations and a nonsingular Universe", JETP Lett, 33, No.10, 532 (1981), see also https://arxiv.org/abs/astro-ph/0303077
- Mukhanov, V. F., and Feldman, H. A., and Brandenberger, R. H.: "Theory of Cosmological Perturbations", Physics Reports (1992)
- Mukhanov, Viatcheslav, Physical Foundations of Cosmology, Cambridge University Press, 2005. ISBN 0-521-56398-4
- Mukhanov, Viatcheslav and Winizki, Sergei,"Introduction to Quantum Effects in Gravity", Cambridge University Press, 2007. ISBN 0521868343

== See also ==
- LMU Munich
