= Alan Guth =

American theoretical physicist and cosmologist

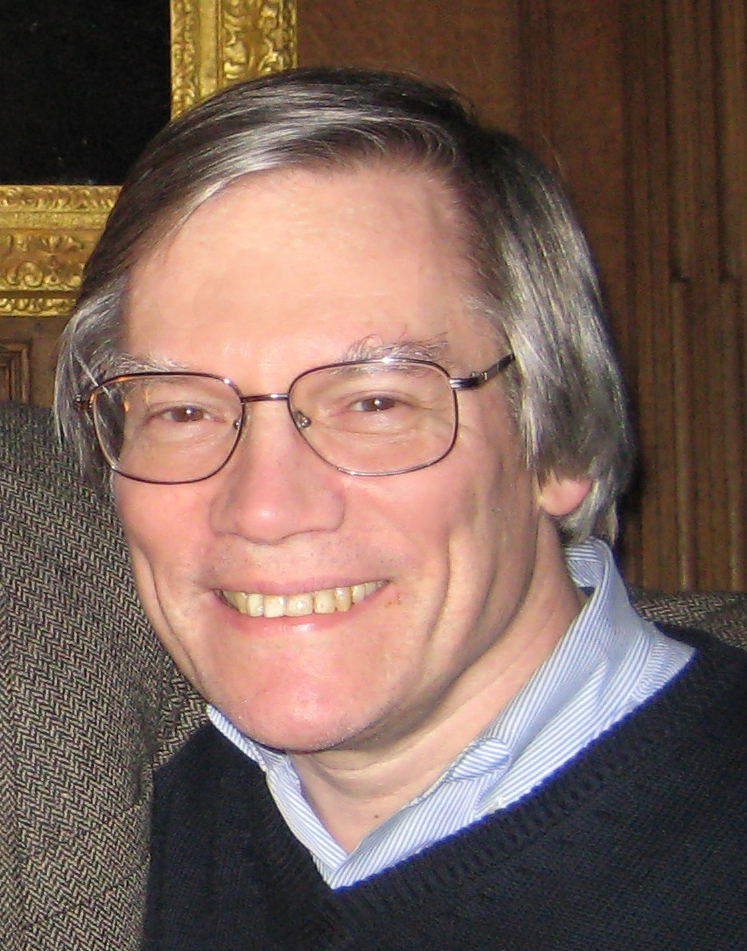
- Guth at Trinity College, Cambridge, 2007
- Born: Alan Harvey Guth; February 27, 1947 (age 79); New Brunswick, New Jersey, U.S.
- Education: Massachusetts Institute of Technology (BS, MS, PhD)
- Known for: Cosmic inflation Borde–Guth–Vilenkin theorem Inflaton
- Spouse: Susan Tisch (m. 1971)
- Children: 2, including Larry Guth
- Awards: Oskar Klein Medal (1991) Benjamin Franklin Medal for Physics of the Franklin Institute; Institute of Physics Isaac Newton Medal (2009); Dirac Prize of the International Center for Theoretical Physics in Trieste; Gruber Prize in Cosmology (2004); Breakthrough Prize in Fundamental Physics (2012) Kavli Prize (2014)
- Scientific career
- Fields: Cosmology, theoretical physics, particle physics
- Workplaces: Princeton; Columbia; Cornell; Stanford Linear Accelerator; MIT
- Doctoral advisor: Francis E. Low

Alan Harvey Guth (/ɡuːθ/; born February 27, 1947) is an American theoretical physicist and cosmologist who is the Victor Weisskopf Professor of Physics at the Massachusetts Institute of Technology. Along with Alexei Starobinsky and Andrei Linde, he won the 2014 Kavli Prize "for pioneering the theory of cosmic inflation." Guth's research focuses on elementary particle theory and how particle theory is applicable to the early universe.

He graduated from MIT in 1968 in physics and stayed to receive a master's and a doctorate, also in physics.

As a junior particle physicist, Guth developed the idea of cosmic inflation in 1979 at Cornell and gave his first seminar on the subject in January 1980. Moving on to the SLAC Theory Group at Stanford University, Guth formally proposed the idea of cosmic inflation in 1981, the idea that the nascent universe passed through a phase of exponential expansion that was driven by a positive vacuum energy density (negative vacuum pressure). The results of the WMAP mission in 2006 made the case for cosmic inflation very compelling.

== Early life and education ==
Guth was born to a Jewish family in New Brunswick, New Jersey in 1947 and grew up across the Raritan River in Highland Park, where he attended the local public schools. After his junior year at Highland Park High School, he left school and enrolled in a five-year program at the Massachusetts Institute of Technology where he could get his bachelor's and master's after two more years. Guth obtained a bachelor's and master's degree in 1969 and a doctorate in 1972. In 1971, he married Susan Tisch, his high school sweetheart. They have two children: Lawrence (born 1977) and Jennifer (born 1983).

Guth was at Princeton 1971 to 1974, Columbia 1974 to 1977, Cornell 1977 to 1979, and the Stanford Linear Accelerator Center (SLAC) 1979 to 1980. Like many other young physicists of the baby boom era, he had a hard time finding a permanent job, because there were far fewer assistant professorships than there were young scientists seeking such jobs, a phenomenon that has been referred to as the "generation of lost scholars."

At the start of his career, Guth studied particle physics, not physical cosmology. Guth's earliest work at Princeton was in the study of quarks, the elementary particles that make up protons and neutrons. At Columbia, Guth studied grand unification theories (GUTs), focusing on the cosmological phase transitions generated by spontaneous symmetry breaking. Most GUTs predict the generation of magnetic monopoles during spontaneous symmetry breaking, but none had ever been detected—the monopole problem.

== Career ==
=== Inflationary theory ===
Guth's first step to developing his theory of inflation occurred at Cornell in 1978, when he attended a lecture by Robert Dicke about the flatness problem of the universe. Dicke explained how the flatness problem showed that something significant was missing from the Big Bang theory at the time. The fate of the universe depended on its density. If the density of the universe was large enough, it would collapse into a singularity, and if the actual density of the matter in the cosmos was lower than the critical density, the universe would increasingly get much bigger.

The next part in Guth's path came when he heard a lecture by Steven Weinberg in early 1979. Weinberg talked in two lectures about the Grand Unified Theory (GUT) that had been developed since 1974, and how it could explain the huge amount of matter in the universe compared to the amount of antimatter. The GUT explained all the fundamental forces known in science except for gravity. It established that in very hot conditions, such as those after the Big Bang, electromagnetism, the strong nuclear force, and the weak nuclear force were united to form one force. Weinberg also was the one who emphasized the idea that the universe goes through phase transitions, similar to the phases of matter, when going from high energy to low energy. Weinberg's discussion of why matter is so dominant over anti-matter showed Guth how precise calculations about particles could be obtained by studying the first few seconds of the universe.

Guth decided to solve this problem by suggesting a supercooling during a delayed phase transition. This seemed very promising for solving the magnetic monopole problem. By the time Guth and his collaborator Henry Tye came up with that, Guth had gone to the Stanford Linear Accelerator Center (SLAC) for a year. Tye suggested that they check that the expansion of the universe would not be affected by the supercooling. The supercooled state is a false vacuum: It is a vacuum in the sense that it is the state of the lowest possible density of energy; it is "false" since its state is not permanent. False vacuums decay, and Guth found that the decay of the false vacuum at the beginning of the universe would produce an exponential expansion of space. This solved the monopole problem, since the expansion proportionately reduces the monopole density.

Guth realized from his theory that the reason the universe appears to be flat was that it had enlarged to such an overwhelming size in comparison to its original size. The perspective is analogous to the apparent flatness of the Earth, on a human scale, when seen from its surface. The observable universe was actually only a very small part of the actual universe. Traditional Big Bang theory found values of omega near 1 to be puzzling, because any deviations from 1 would quickly become much, much larger. In inflation theory, no matter where omega starts, it would approach 1 because of the scale of the universe's expansion. In fact, a major prediction of inflationary theory is that omega will be found to be precisely 1.

Two weeks later, Guth heard colleagues discussing something called the horizon problem. The microwave background radiation discovered by Arno Penzias and Robert Woodrow Wilson appeared extremely uniform, with almost no variance. This seemed very paradoxical because when the radiation was released about 300,000 years after the Big Bang, the observable universe had a diameter of 90 million light-years. There was no time for one end of the cosmos to communicate with the other end, because energy cannot move faster than the speed of light. The paradox was resolved, as Guth soon realized, by the inflation theory. Since inflation started with a far smaller amount of matter than the Big Bang had presupposed, an amount so small that all parts would have been causally connected with each other. The universe then inflated, and the homogeneity remained unbroken. The universe after inflation would have been uniform, even if its parts couldn't affect each other.

Guth first made public his ideas on inflation in a seminar at SLAC in January 1980. He ignored magnetic monopoles because they were based on assumptions of GUT, which was outside the scope of the speech. In August 1980, he submitted his paper, entitled "Inflationary universe: A possible solution to the horizon and flatness problems" to the journal Physical Review. In this paper Guth postulated that the inflation of the universe could be explained if the universe were supercooled 28 orders of magnitude below the critical temperatures required for a phase change.

In December 1981, Guth read a paper from Moscow physicist Andrei Linde saying that the whole universe is within just one bubble, so nothing is destroyed by wall collisions. This conclusion was made using a Higgs field with an energy graph that was originally proposed by Sidney Coleman and Erick Weinberg. Guth discussed this with Linde, who had independently been working on bubble inflation but without considering the flatness problem. Linde and Guth eventually exchanged papers on the subject.

By 1983, Guth had published a paper describing how his supercooled universe scenario was not ideal, as the "triggering mechanism" to exit such a state would require "extreme fine tuning of parameters" and felt a more natural solution was required. However, this did not deter him from the belief that the universe expanded exponentially in a vacuum in its early lifetime.

== Current interests ==
In the past, Guth has studied lattice gauge theory, magnetic monopoles and instantons, Gott time machines, and a number of other topics in theoretical physics. Much of Guth's current work includes extrapolating density fluctuations arising from various versions of inflation to test against observations and investigating inflation in "brane world" models.

He is the Victor F. Weisskopf Professor of Physics at the Massachusetts Institute of Technology (MIT). He has written more than 60 technical papers related to the effects of inflation and its interactions with particle physics.

== Honors and awards ==
Guth has won many awards and medals, including the Medal of the International Center for Theoretical Physics, Trieste, Italy, with Andrei Linde and Paul Steinhardt and the Eddington Medal in 1996, and the 2009 Isaac Newton Medal, awarded by the British Institute of Physics.

In July 2012, he was an inaugural awardee of the Breakthrough Prize in Fundamental Physics, the creation of physicist and internet entrepreneur, Yuri Milner.

In 2014, he was a co-recipient of the Kavli Prize awarded by the Norwegian Academy of Science and Letters, together with Andrei Linde of Stanford University, and Alexei Starobinsky of the Landau Institute for Theoretical Physics, "for pioneering the theory of cosmic inflation." That same year, Guth received the Golden Plate Award of the American Academy of Achievement.

In 2005, Guth won the award for the messiest office in Boston, organised by The Boston Globe. He was entered by colleagues who hoped it would shame him into tidying up, but Guth is quite proud of the award.

== Publications ==
- Guth, Alan (1997). The Inflationary Universe: The Quest for a New Theory of Cosmic Origins. Perseus Books. ISBN 0201328402.
- Guth, Alan (Fall 2002). "Inflation and the New Era of High-Precision Cosmology" (PDF). physics@mit. MIT Department of Physics.

== See also ==
- MIT Center for Theoretical Physics
- MIT Physics Department
