= Future of an expanding universe =

Aspect of physical cosmology

Current observations suggest that the expansion of the universe will continue forever. The prevailing theory is that the universe will cool as it expands, eventually becoming too cold to sustain life. For this reason, this future scenario popularly called "Heat Death" is also known as the "Big Chill" or "Big Freeze". Some of the other popular theories include the Big Rip, the Big Crunch, the Big Bounce, and the Big Slurp.

If dark energy—represented by the cosmological constant, a constant energy density filling space homogeneously, or scalar fields, such as quintessence or moduli, dynamic quantities whose energy density can vary in time and space—accelerates the expansion of the universe, then the space between clusters of galaxies will grow at an increasing rate. Redshift will stretch ancient ambient photons (including gamma rays) to undetectably long wavelengths and low energies. Stars are expected to form normally for 10^{12} to 10^{14} (1–100 trillion) years, but eventually the supply of gas needed for star formation will be exhausted. As existing stars run out of fuel and cease to shine, the universe will slowly and inexorably grow darker. If proton decay is correct, which currently remains unproven and against the fundamental principles of particle physics, the stellar remnants left behind will disappear, leaving behind only black holes, which themselves eventually disappear as they emit Hawking radiation. Ultimately, if the universe reaches thermodynamic equilibrium, a state in which the temperature approaches a uniform value, it is highly unlikely any further work will be possible, resulting in a final heat death of the universe.

== Cosmology ==
Infinite expansion does not constrain the overall spatial curvature of the universe. It can be open (with negative spatial curvature), flat, or closed (positive spatial curvature), although if it is closed, sufficient dark energy must be present to counteract the gravitational forces or else the universe will end in a Big Crunch.

Observations of the Cosmic microwave background by the Wilkinson Microwave Anisotropy Probe and the Planck mission suggest that the universe is spatially flat and has a significant amount of dark energy. In this case, the universe might continue to expand at an accelerating rate. The acceleration of the universe's expansion has also been confirmed by observations of distant supernovae. If, as in the concordance model of physical cosmology (Lambda-cold dark matter or ΛCDM), dark energy is in the form of a cosmological constant, the expansion will eventually become exponential, with the size of the universe doubling at a constant rate.

If the theory of inflation is correct, the universe went through an episode dominated by a different form of dark energy in the first moments of the Big Bang; but inflation ended, indicating an equation of state much more complicated than those assumed so far for present-day dark energy. It is possible that the dark energy equation of state could change again resulting in an event that would have consequences which are extremely difficult to parametrize or predict.

== Future history ==
In the 1970s, the future of an expanding universe was studied by the astrophysicist Jamal Islam and the physicist Freeman Dyson. Then, in their 1999 book The Five Ages of the Universe, the astrophysicists Fred Adams and Gregory Laughlin divided the past and future history of an expanding universe into five eras. The first, the Primordial Era, is the time in the past just after the Big Bang when stars had not yet formed. The second, the Stelliferous Era, includes the present day and all of the stars and galaxies now seen. It is the time during which stars form from collapsing clouds of gas. In the subsequent Degenerate Era, the stars will have burnt out, leaving all stellar-mass objects as stellar remnants—white dwarfs, neutron stars, and black holes. In the Black Hole Era, white dwarfs, neutron stars, and other smaller astronomical objects have been destroyed by proton decay, leaving only black holes. Finally, in the Dark Era, even black holes have disappeared, leaving only a dilute gas of photons and leptons.

This future history and the timeline below assume the continued expansion of the universe. If space in the universe begins to contract, subsequent events in the timeline may not occur because the Big Crunch, the collapse of the universe into a hot, dense state similar to that after the Big Bang, will prevail.

== Timeline ==
=== The Stelliferous Era ===
From the present to about 10^{14} (100 trillion) years after the Big Bang

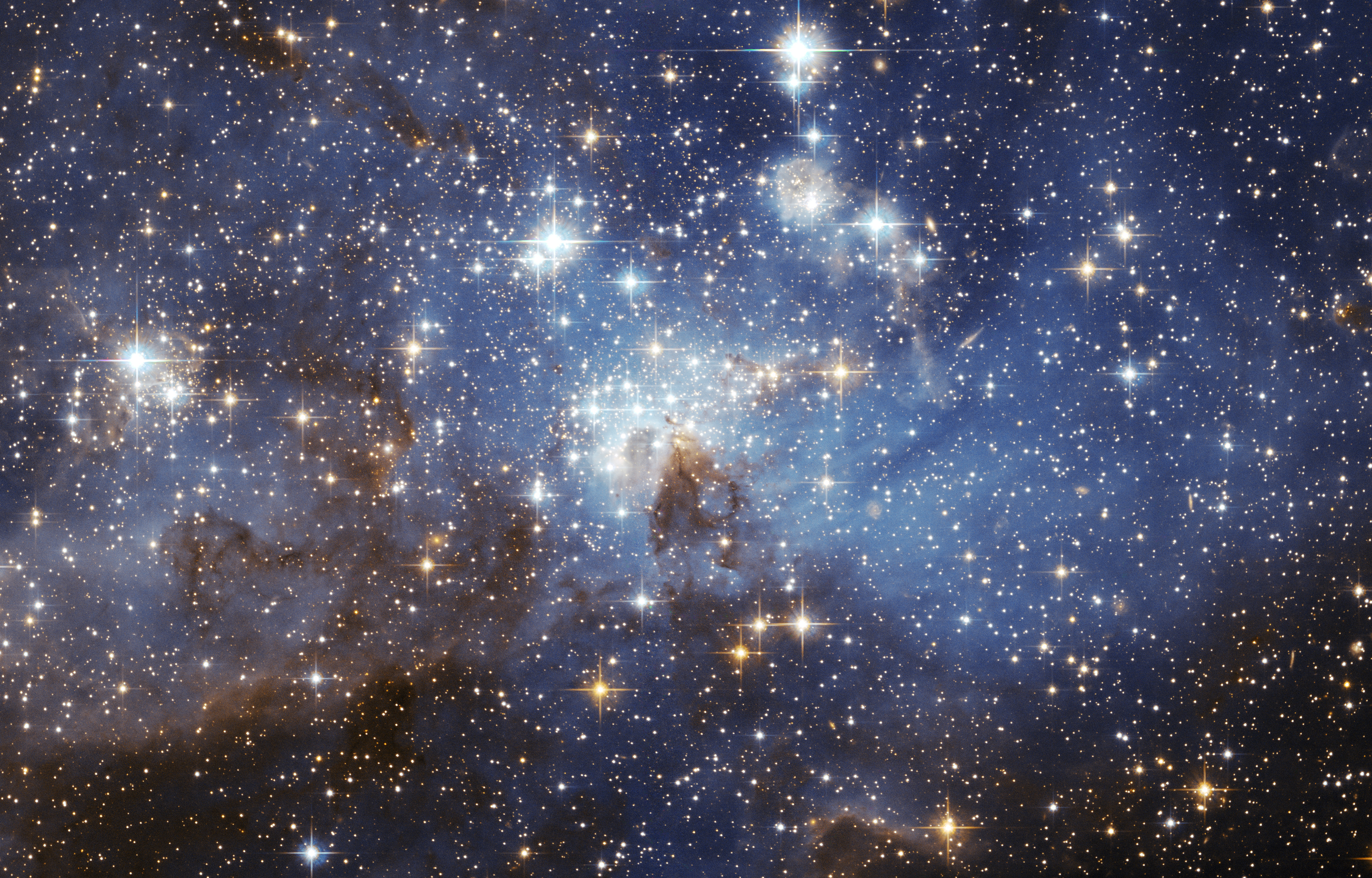
An image of many stars. LH 95 star forming region of the Large Magellanic Cloud. The image was taken using the Hubble Space Telescope. Source: European Space Agency (ESA/Hubble)

The observable universe is currently 1.38×10^{10} (13.8 billion) years old. This time lies within the Stelliferous Era. About 155 million years after the Big Bang, the first star formed. Since then, stars have formed by the collapse of small, dense core regions in large, cold molecular clouds of hydrogen gas. At first, this produces a protostar, which is hot and bright because of energy generated by gravitational contraction. After the protostar contracts for a while, its core could become hot enough to fuse hydrogen, if it exceeds critical mass, a process called 'stellar ignition' occurs, and its lifetime as a star will properly begin.

Stars of very low mass will eventually exhaust all their fusible hydrogen and then become helium white dwarfs. Stars of low to medium mass, such as our own sun, will expel some of their mass as a planetary nebula and eventually become white dwarfs; more massive stars will explode in a core-collapse supernova, leaving behind neutron stars or black holes. In any case, although some of the star's matter may be returned to the interstellar medium, a degenerate remnant will be left behind whose mass is not returned to the interstellar medium. Therefore, the supply of gas available for star formation is steadily being exhausted.

==== Milky Way Galaxy and the Andromeda Galaxy merge into one ====
4–8 billion years from now (17.8–21.8 billion years after the Big Bang)

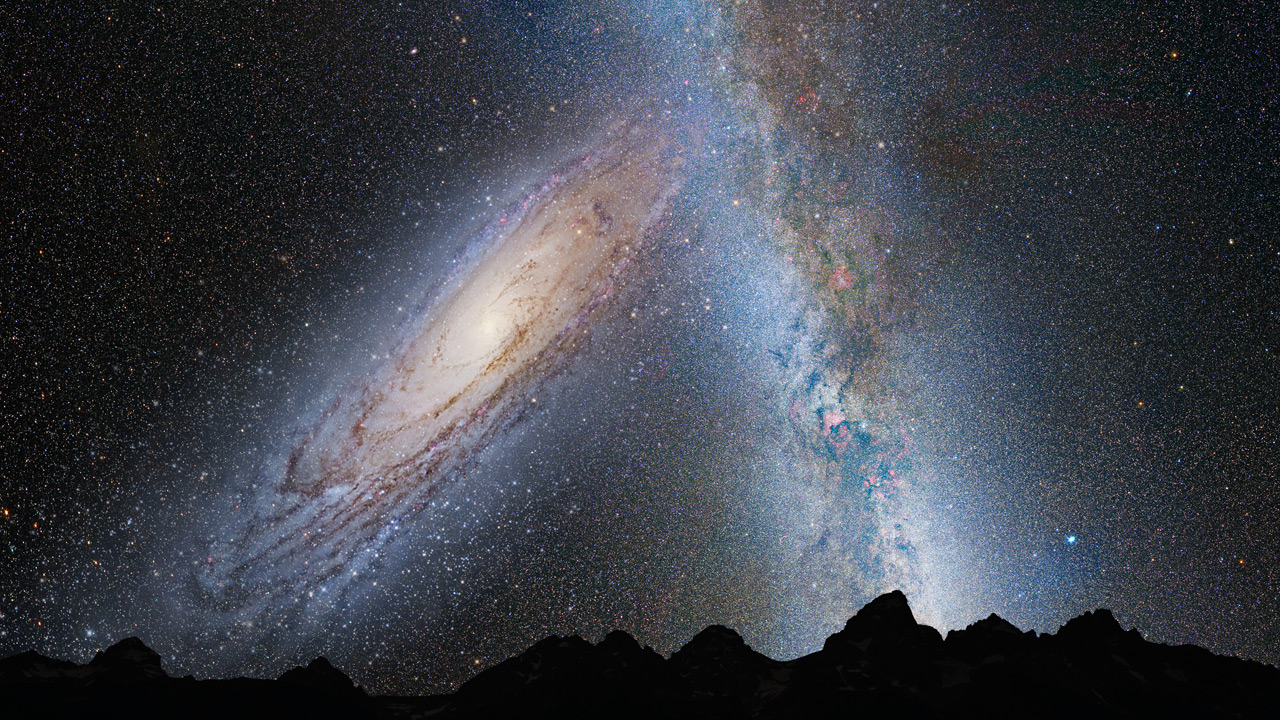
An artistic (not truly realistic) illustration of the view from Earth during the Milky way-Andromeda galaxy collision event

The Andromeda Galaxy is approximately 2.5 million light years away from our galaxy, the Milky Way galaxy, and they are moving towards each other at approximately 300 kilometres (186 miles) per second. Approximately five billion years from now, or 19 billion years after the Big Bang, the Milky Way and the Andromeda galaxy may collide with one another and merge into one large galaxy. Up until 2012, there was no way to confirm whether the possible collision was going to happen. In 2012, researchers came to the conclusion that the collision is definite after using the Hubble Space Telescope between 2002 and 2010 to track the motion of Andromeda. In 2025, researchers, using the latest observations from Gaia and the Hubble Space Telescope, found that there is only a 50% chance of collision between the two galaxies in the next 10 billion years.

22 billion years in the future is the earliest possible end of the Universe in the Big Rip scenario, assuming a model of dark energy with w = −1.5.

False vacuum decay may occur in 20 to 30 billion years if the Higgs field is metastable.

==== Coalescence of Local Group and galaxies outside the Local Supercluster are no longer accessible ====
10^{11} (100 billion) to 10^{12} (1 trillion) years

The galaxies in the Local Group, the cluster of galaxies which includes the Milky Way and the Andromeda Galaxy, are gravitationally bound to each other. It is expected that between 10^{11} (100 billion) and 10^{12} (1 trillion) years from now, their orbits will decay and the entire Local Group will merge into one large galaxy.

Assuming that dark energy continues to make the universe expand at an accelerating rate, in about 150 billion years all galaxies outside the Local Supercluster will pass behind the cosmological horizon. It will then be impossible for events in the Local Supercluster to affect other galaxies. Similarly, it will be impossible for events after 150 billion years, as seen by observers in distant galaxies, to affect events in the Local Supercluster. However, an observer in the Local Supercluster will continue to see distant galaxies, but events they observe will become exponentially more redshifted as the galaxy approaches the horizon until time in the distant galaxy seems to stop. The observer in the Local Supercluster never observes events after 150 billion years in their local time, and eventually all light and background radiation lying outside the Local Supercluster will appear to blink out as light becomes so redshifted that its wavelength has become longer than the physical diameter of the horizon.

Technically, it will take an infinitely long time for all causal interaction between the Local Supercluster and this light to cease. However, due to the redshifting explained above, the light will not necessarily be observed for an infinite amount of time, and after 150 billion years, no new causal interaction will be observed.

Therefore, after 150 billion years, intergalactic transportation and communication beyond the Local Supercluster becomes causally impossible.

==== Luminosities of galaxies begin to diminish ====
8×10^{11} (800 billion) years

8×10^{11} (800 billion) years from now, the luminosities of the different galaxies, approximately similar until then to the current ones thanks to the increasing luminosity of the remaining stars as they age, will start to decrease, as the less massive red dwarf stars begin to die as white dwarfs.

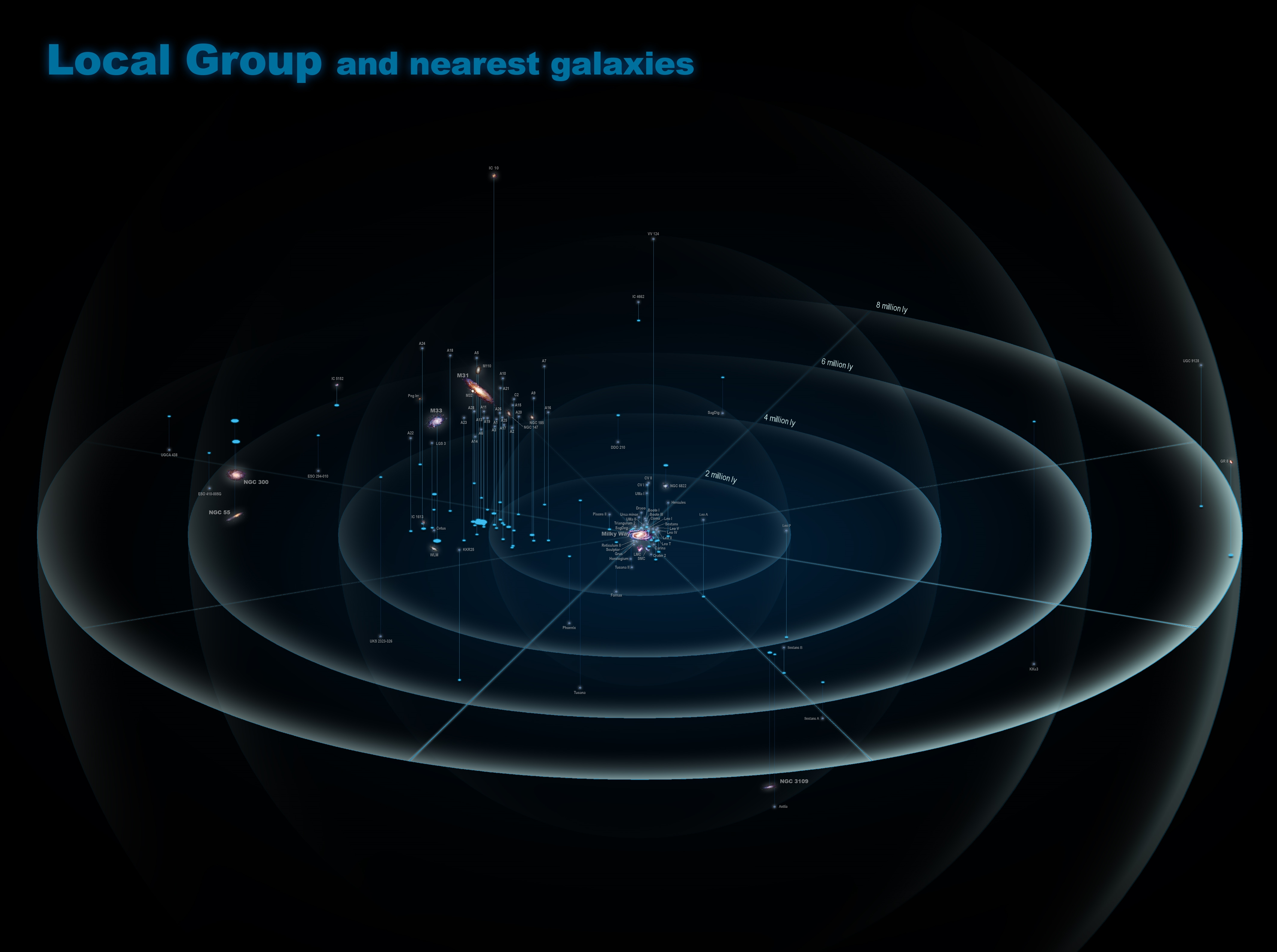
An illustration of the local group of galaxies

==== Galaxies outside the Local Supercluster are no longer detectable ====
2×10^{12} (2 trillion) years

2×10^{12} (2 trillion) years from now, all galaxies outside the Local Supercluster will be redshifted to such an extent that even gamma rays they emit will have wavelengths longer than the size of the observable universe of the time. Therefore, these galaxies will no longer be detectable in any way.

=== Degenerate Era ===
From 10^{14} (100 trillion) to 10^{40} (10 duodecillion) years

By 10^{14} (100 trillion) years from now, star formation will end, leaving all stellar objects in the form of degenerate remnants. If protons do not decay, stellar-mass objects will disappear more slowly, making this era last longer.

==== Star formation ceases ====
10^{12–14} (1–100 trillion) years

By 10^{14} (100 trillion) years from now, star formation will end. This period, known as the "Degenerate Era", will last until the degenerate remnants finally decay. The least-massive stars take the longest to exhaust their hydrogen fuel (see stellar evolution). Thus, the longest living stars in the universe are low-mass red dwarfs, with a mass of about 0.08 solar masses (M_{☉}), which have a lifetime of over 10^{13} (10 trillion) years. Coincidentally, this is comparable to the length of time over which star formation takes place. Once star formation ends and the least-massive red dwarfs exhaust their fuel, nuclear fusion will cease. The low-mass red dwarfs will cool and become black dwarfs. The only objects remaining with more than planetary mass will be brown dwarfs (with mass less than 0.08 M_{☉}), and degenerate remnants: white dwarfs, produced by stars with initial masses between about 0.08 and 8 solar masses, and neutron stars and black holes, produced by stars with initial masses over 8 M_{☉}. Most of the mass of this collection, approximately 90%, will be in the form of white dwarfs. In the absence of any energy source, all of these formerly luminous bodies will cool and become faint.

The universe will become extremely dark after the last stars burn out. Even so, there can still be occasional light in the universe. One of the ways the universe can be illuminated is if two carbon–oxygen white dwarfs with a combined mass of more than the Chandrasekhar limit of about 1.4 solar masses happen to merge. The resulting object will then undergo runaway thermonuclear fusion, producing a Type Ia supernova and dispelling the darkness of the Degenerate Era for a few weeks. Neutron stars could also collide, forming even brighter supernovae and dispelling up to 6 solar masses of degenerate gas into the interstellar medium. The resulting matter from these supernovae could potentially create new stars. If the combined mass is not above the Chandrasekhar limit but is larger than the minimum mass to fuse carbon (about 0.9 M_{☉}), a carbon star could be produced, with a lifetime of around 10^{6} (1 million) years. Also, if two helium white dwarfs with a combined mass of at least 0.3 M_{☉} collide, a helium star may be produced, with a lifetime of a few hundred million years. Finally, brown dwarfs could form new stars by colliding with each other to form red dwarf stars, which can survive for 10^{13} (10 trillion) years, or by accreting gas at very slow rates from the remaining interstellar medium until they have enough mass to start hydrogen burning as red dwarfs. This process, at least on white dwarfs, could induce Type Ia supernovae.

==== Planets fall or are flung from orbits by a close encounter with another star ====
10^{15} (1 quadrillion) years

Over time, the orbits of planets will decay due to gravitational radiation, or planets will be ejected from their local systems by gravitational perturbations caused by encounters with another stellar remnant.

==== Stellar remnants escape galaxies or fall into black holes ====
10^{19} to 10^{20} (10 to 100 quintillion) years

Over time, objects in a galaxy exchange kinetic energy in a process called dynamical relaxation, making their velocity distribution approach the Maxwell–Boltzmann distribution. Dynamical relaxation can proceed either by close encounters of two stars or by less violent but more frequent distant encounters. In the case of a close encounter, two brown dwarfs or stellar remnants will pass close to each other. When this happens, the trajectories of the objects involved in the close encounter change slightly, in such a way that their kinetic energies are more nearly equal than before. After a large number of encounters, then, lighter objects tend to gain speed while the heavier objects lose it.

Because of dynamical relaxation, some objects will gain just enough energy to reach galactic escape velocity and depart the galaxy, leaving behind a smaller, denser galaxy. Since encounters are more frequent in this denser galaxy, the process then accelerates. The result is that most objects (90% to 99%) are ejected from the galaxy, leaving a small fraction (maybe 1% to 10%) which fall into the central supermassive black hole. It has been suggested that the matter of the fallen remnants will form an accretion disk around it that will create a quasar, as long as enough matter is present there.

==== Possible ionization of matter ====
> 10^{23} years from now

In an expanding universe with decreasing density and non-zero cosmological constant, matter density would reach zero, resulting in most matter except black dwarfs, neutron stars, black holes, and planets ionizing and dissipating at thermal equilibrium.

== Future with proton decay ==
The following timeline assumes that protons do decay.

Chance: 10^{32} (100 nonillion) – 10^{42} years (1 tredecillion)

The subsequent evolution of the universe depends on the possibility and rate of proton decay. Experimental evidence shows that if the proton is unstable, it has a half-life of at least 10^{35} years. Some of the Grand Unified theories (GUTs) predict long-term proton instability between 10^{32} and 10^{38} years, with the upper bound on standard (non-supersymmetry) proton decay at 1.4×10^{36} years and an overall upper limit maximum for any proton decay (including supersymmetry models) at 6×10^{42} years. Recent research showing proton lifetime (if unstable) at or exceeding 10^{36}–10^{37} year range rules out simpler GUTs and most non-supersymmetry models.

=== Nucleons start to decay ===
Neutrons bound into nuclei are also suspected to decay with a half-life comparable to that of protons. Planets (substellar objects) would decay in a simple cascade process from heavier elements to hydrogen and finally to photons and leptons while radiating energy.

If the proton does not decay at all, then stellar objects would still disappear, but more slowly. See § Future without proton decay below.

Shorter or longer proton half-lives will accelerate or decelerate the process. This means that after 10^{40} years (the maximum proton half-life used by Adams & Laughlin (1997)), one-half of all baryonic matter will have been converted into gamma ray photons and leptons through proton decay.

=== All nucleons decay ===
10^{43} (10 tredecillion) years

Given the assumed half-life of the proton, nucleons (protons and bound neutrons) will have undergone roughly 1,000 half-lives by the time the universe is 10^{43} years old. This means that there will be roughly 0.5^{1,000} (approximately 10^{−301}) as many nucleons; as there are an estimated 10^{80} protons currently in the universe, none will remain at the end of the Degenerate Age. Effectively, all baryonic matter will have been changed into photons and leptons. Some models predict the formation of stable positronium atoms with diameters greater than the observable universe's current diameter (roughly 6 ×10^{34} metres) in 10^{98} years, and that these will in turn decay to gamma radiation in 10^{176} years.

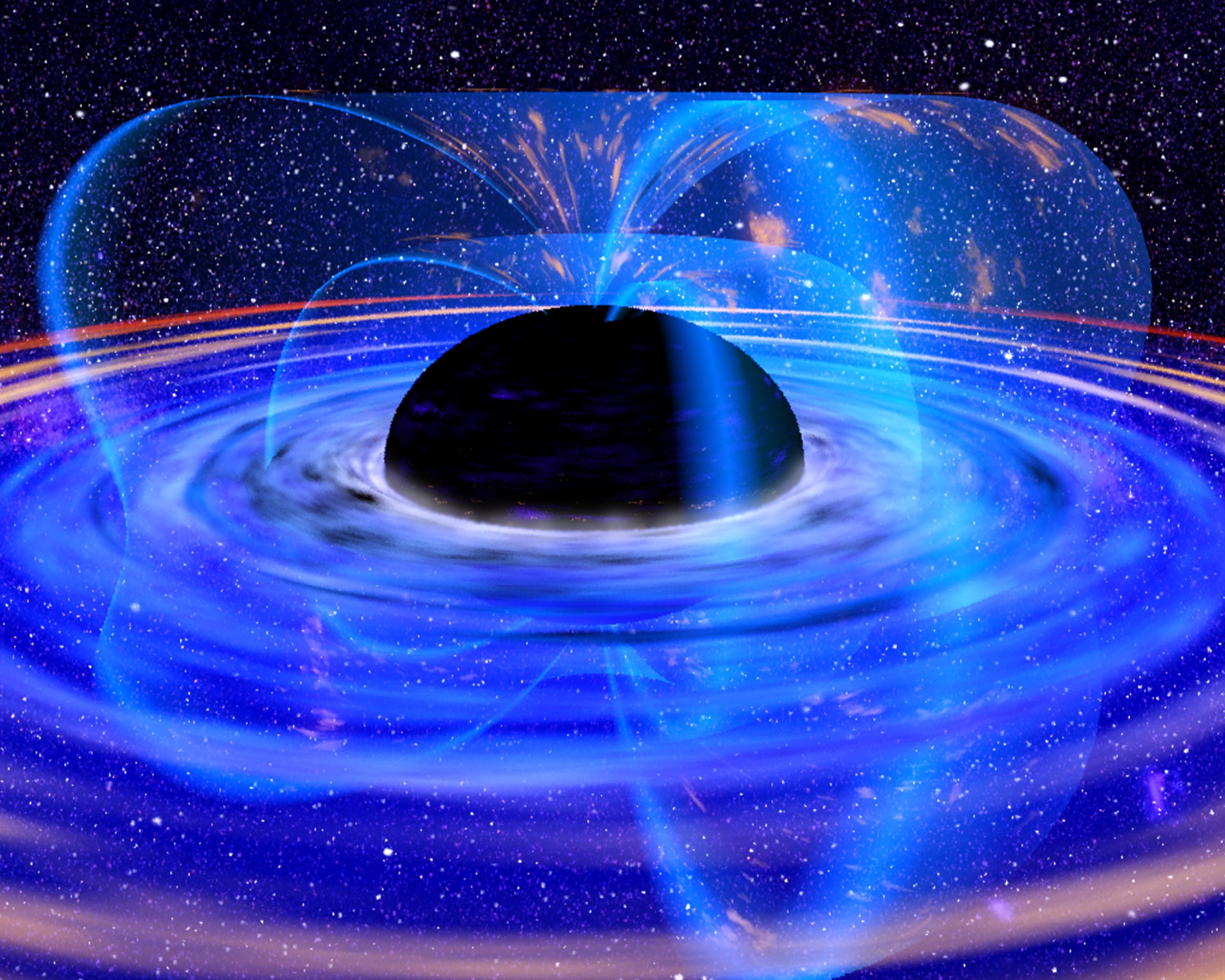
Supermassive black holes are expected to outlast proton decay, but will eventually evaporate completely.

=== If protons decay on higher-order nuclear processes ===
Chance: 10^{76} to 10^{220} years

If the proton does not decay according to the theories described above, then the Degenerate Era will last longer, and will overlap or surpass the Black Hole Era. On a time scale of 10^{65} years solid matter is theorized to potentially rearrange its atoms and molecules via quantum tunneling, and may behave as liquid and become smooth spheres due to diffusion and gravity. Degenerate stellar objects can potentially still experience proton decay, for example via processes involving the Adler–Bell–Jackiw anomaly, virtual black holes, or higher-dimension supersymmetry possibly with a half-life of under 10^{220} years.

>10^{145} years from now

2018 estimate of Standard Model lifetime before collapse of a false vacuum; 95% confidence interval is 10^{65} to 10^{725} years due in part to uncertainty about the top quark mass.

>10^{200} years from now

Although protons are stable in standard model physics, a quantum anomaly may exist on the electroweak level, which can cause groups of baryons (protons and neutrons) to annihilate into antileptons via the sphaleron transition. Such baryon/lepton violations have a number of 3 and can only occur in multiples or groups of three baryons, which can restrict or prohibit such events. No experimental evidence of sphalerons has yet been observed at low energy levels, though they are believed to occur regularly at high energies and temperatures.

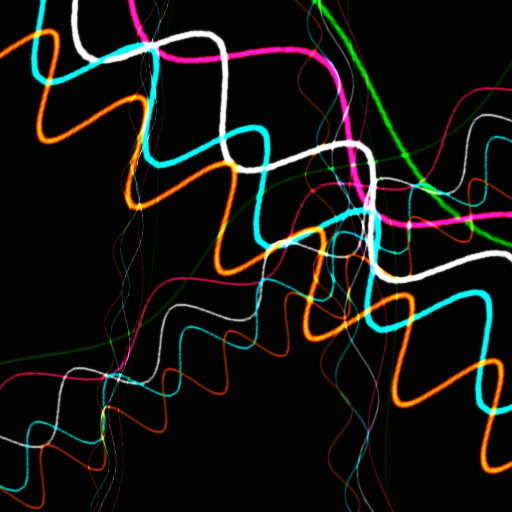
Photons, electrons, positrons, and neutrinos are all that remain after the last supermassive black holes evaporate.

=== Black Hole Era ===
10^{43} (10 tredecillion) years to approximately 10^{100} (1 googol) years, up to 10^{110} years for the largest supermassive black holes

After 10^{43} years, black holes will dominate the universe. They will slowly evaporate via Hawking radiation. A black hole with a mass of around 1 M_{☉} will vanish in around 2×10^{64} years. As the lifetime of a black hole is proportional to the cube of its mass, more massive black holes take longer to decay. A supermassive black hole with a mass of 10^{11} (100 billion) M_{☉} will evaporate in around 2×10^{93} years.

The largest black holes in the universe are predicted to continue to grow. Larger black holes of up to 10^{14} (100 trillion) M_{☉} may form during the collapse of superclusters of galaxies. Even these would evaporate over a timescale of 10^{109} to 10^{110} years.

Hawking radiation has a thermal spectrum. During most of a black hole's lifetime, the radiation has a low temperature and is mainly in the form of massless particles such as photons and hypothetical gravitons. As the black hole's mass decreases, its temperature increases, becoming comparable to the Sun's by the time the black hole mass has decreased to 10^{19} kilograms. The hole then provides a temporary source of light during the general darkness of the Black Hole Era. During the last stages of its evaporation, a black hole will emit not only massless particles, but also heavier particles, such as electrons, positrons, protons, and antiprotons.

=== Dark Era and Photon Age ===
From 10^{100} years (10 duotrigintillion years or 1 googol years) and beyond

After all the black holes have evaporated (and after all the ordinary matter made of protons has disintegrated, if protons are unstable), the universe will be nearly empty. Photons, leptons, baryons, neutrinos, electrons, and positrons will fly from place to place, hardly ever encountering each other. Gravitationally, the universe will be dominated by dark matter, electrons, and positrons (not protons).

By this era, with only very diffuse matter remaining, activity in the universe will eventually tail off dramatically (compared with previous eras), with very low energy levels and very large time scales, with events taking a very long time to happen if they ever happen at all. Electrons and positrons drifting through space will encounter one another and occasionally form positronium atoms. These structures are unstable, however, and their constituent particles must eventually annihilate. However, most electrons and positrons will remain unbound. Other low-level annihilation events will also take place, albeit extremely slowly. The universe now gradually tends towards its lowest energy state.

== Future without proton decay ==
If protons do not decay, stellar-mass objects will still become black holes, although even more slowly. The following timeline that assumes proton decay does not take place.

10^{161} years from now

2018 estimate of Standard Model lifetime before collapse of a false vacuum; 95% confidence interval is 10^{65} to 10^{1383} years due in part to uncertainty about the top quark mass. (Note: Manuscript was updated after publication; lifetime numbers are taken from the latest revision at https://arxiv.org/abs/1707.08124.)

=== Degenerate Era ===
==== Matter decays into iron ====
10^{1100} to 10^{32000} years from now

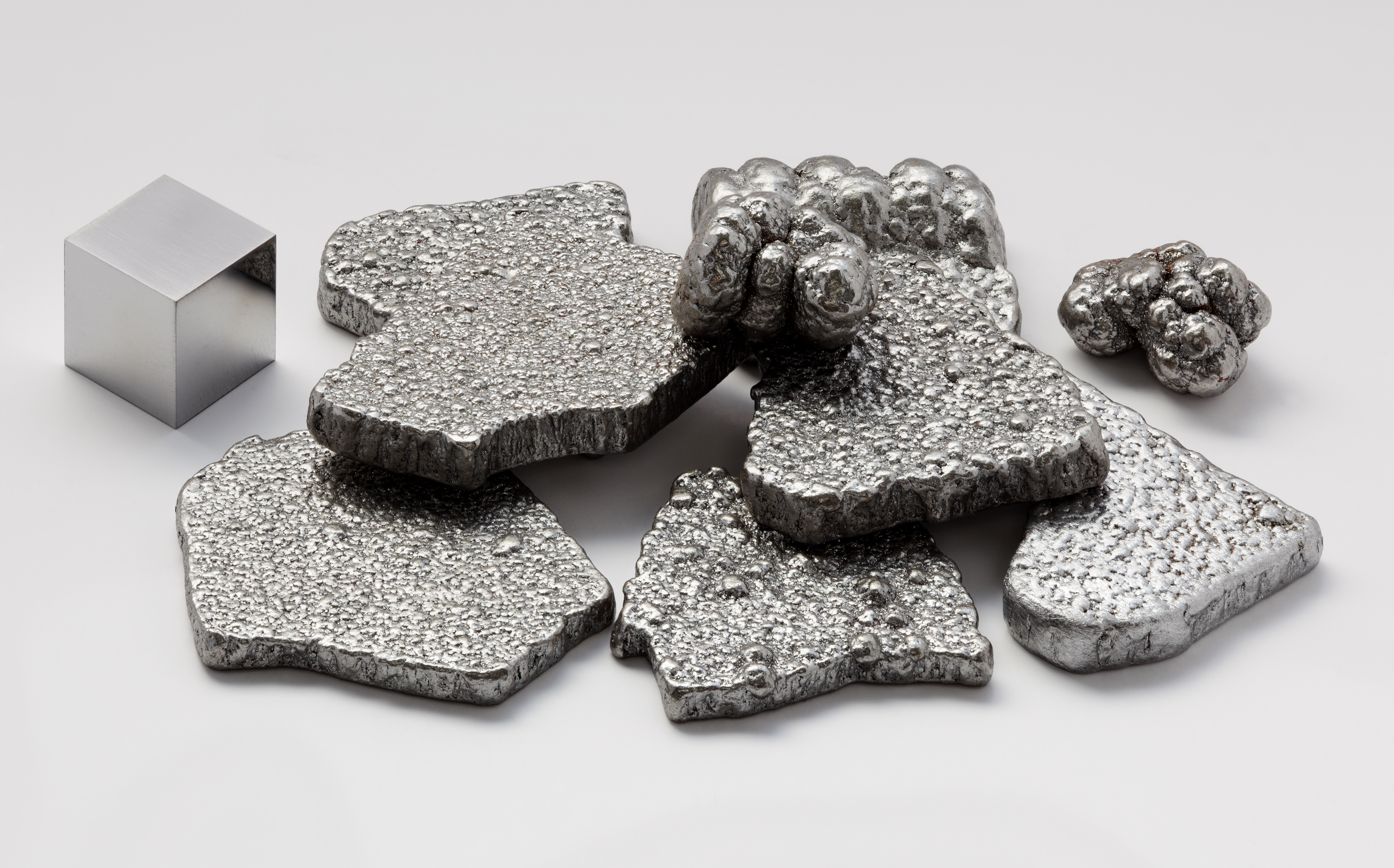
All matter will slowly decay into iron, which will take from 10^{1100} to 10^{32000} years.

In 10^{1500} years, pycnonuclear fusion occurring via quantum tunnelling should make the light nuclei in stellar-mass objects fuse into iron-56 nuclei (see isotopes of iron). Fission and alpha particle emission should make heavy nuclei also decay to iron, leaving stellar-mass objects as cold spheres of iron, called iron stars. Before this happens, however, in some black dwarfs the process is expected to lower their Chandrasekhar limit resulting in a supernova in 10^{1100} years. Non-degenerate silicon has been calculated to tunnel to iron in approximately 10^{32000} years.

=== Black Hole Era ===
==== Collapse of iron stars to black holes ====
10^{10^{30}} to 10^{10^{105}} years from now

Quantum tunneling should also turn large objects into black holes, which (on these timescales) will evaporate into subatomic particles. Depending on the assumptions made, the time this takes to happen can be calculated as from 10^{10^{26}} years to 10^{10^{76}} years. Quantum tunneling may also make iron stars collapse into neutron stars in around 10^{10^{76}} years.

=== Dark Era (without proton decay) ===
10^{10^{105}} to 10^{10^{120}} years from now

With black holes having evaporated, nearly all baryonic matter will have decayed into subatomic particles (electrons, neutrons, protons, and quarks). The universe is now an almost pure vacuum (possibly accompanied with the presence of a false vacuum). The expansion of the universe slowly causes itself to cool down to absolute zero. The universe now reaches an even lower energy state than the earlier one mentioned.

== Beyond ==
Beyond 10^{2500} years if proton decay occurs, or 10^{10^{76}} years without proton decay

Whatever event happens beyond this era is highly speculative. It is possible that a Big Rip event may occur far off into the future. This singularity would take place at a finite scale factor.

If the current vacuum state is a false vacuum, the vacuum may decay into an even lower-energy state.

Presumably, extreme low-energy states imply that localized quantum events become major macroscopic phenomena rather than negligible microscopic events because even the smallest perturbations make the biggest difference in this era, so there is no telling what will or might happen to space or time. It is perceived that the laws of "macro-physics" will break down, and the laws of quantum physics will prevail.

It has been hypothesized that, over a vast amount of time, there could also possibly be a spontaneous entropy decrease, by a Poincaré recurrence or through thermal fluctuations (see also fluctuation theorem). Through this, the universe could possibly avoid an eternal heat death through random quantum tunneling and quantum fluctuations, given the non-zero probability of producing a new Big Bang creating a new universe in roughly 10^{10^{10^{56}}} years, according to physicists Sean M. Carroll and Jennifer Chen.

== Graphical timelines ==
If protons decay:

If protons do not decay:

== See also ==
- Big Bounce – Model for the origin of the universe
- Big Crunch – Hypothetical scenario for the ultimate fate of the universe
- Big Rip – Cosmological model
- Chronology of the universe – History and future of the universe
- Cyclic model – Cosmological models involving indefinite, self-sustaining cycles
- Dyson's eternal intelligence – Hypothetical concept in astrophysics
- The Last Question – A short story by Isaac Asimov which considers the inevitable outcome of heat death in the universe and how it may be reversed.
- Heat death of the universe – Possible fate of the universe
- Timeline of the far future – Scientific projections regarding the far future
- Ultimate fate of the universe – Theories about the end of the universe
