= Ultimate fate of the universe =

Theories about the end of the universe

The ultimate fate of the universe is a topic in physical cosmology, whose theoretical restrictions allow possible scenarios for the evolution of the universe and the ultimate fate of the universe to be described and evaluated. Based on available observational evidence, deciding the fate and evolution of the universe has become a valid cosmological question, being beyond the mostly untestable constraints of mythological or theological beliefs. Several possible futures have been predicted by different scientific hypotheses, including that the universe might have existed for a finite or infinite duration, or towards explaining the manner and circumstances of its beginning.

Observations made by astronomer Edwin Hubble during the 1930s–1950s found that galaxies appeared to be moving away from each other, leading to the currently accepted Big Bang theory. This suggests that the universe began very dense about 13.787 billion years ago, and it has expanded and (on average) become less dense ever since. Confirmation of the Big Bang mostly depends on knowing the rate of expansion, average density of matter, and the physical properties of the mass–energy in the universe.

There is a strong consensus among cosmologists that the shape of the universe is considered "flat" (parallel lines stay parallel), and the universe will continue to expand forever.

Factors that need to be considered in determining the universe's origin and ultimate fate include the average motions of galaxies, the shape and structure of the universe, and the amount of dark matter and dark energy that the universe contains.

== Emerging scientific basis ==
=== Theory ===
The theoretical scientific exploration of the ultimate fate of the universe became possible with Albert Einstein's 1915 theory of general relativity. General relativity can be employed to describe the universe on the largest possible scale. There are several possible solutions to the equations of general relativity, and each solution implies a possible ultimate fate of the universe.

Alexander Friedmann proposed several solutions in 1922, as did Georges Lemaître in 1927. In some of these solutions, the universe has been expanding from an initial singularity which was, essentially, the Big Bang.

=== Observation ===
In 1929, Edwin Hubble published his conclusion, based on his observations of Cepheid variable stars in distant galaxies, that the universe was expanding. From then on, the beginning of the universe and its possible end have been the subjects of serious scientific investigation.

=== Big Bang and Steady State theories ===
In 1927, Georges Lemaître set out a theory that has since come to be called the Big Bang theory of the origin of the universe. In 1948, Fred Hoyle set out his opposing Steady State theory in which the universe continually expanded but remained statistically unchanged as new matter is constantly created. These two theories were active contenders until the 1965 discovery, by Arno Allan Penzias and Robert Woodrow Wilson, of the cosmic microwave background radiation, a fact that is a straightforward prediction of the Big Bang theory, and one that the original Steady State theory could not account for. As a result, the Big Bang theory quickly became the most widely held view of the origin of the universe.

=== Cosmological constant ===
Einstein and his contemporaries believed in a static universe. When Einstein found that his general relativity equations could easily be solved in such a way as to allow the universe to be expanding at the present and contracting in the far future, he added to those equations what he called a cosmological constant — essentially a constant energy density, unaffected by any expansion or contraction — whose role was to offset the effect of gravity on the universe as a whole in such a way that the universe would remain static. However, after Hubble announced his conclusion that the universe was expanding, Einstein would write that his cosmological constant was "the greatest blunder of my life."

=== Density parameter ===
An important parameter in fate of the universe theory is the density parameter, omega ($\Omega$), defined as the average matter density of the universe divided by a critical value of that density. This selects one of three possible geometries depending on whether $\Omega$ is equal to, less than, or greater than $1$. These are called, respectively, the flat, open and closed universes. These three adjectives refer to the overall geometry of the universe, and not to the local curving of spacetime caused by smaller clumps of mass (for example, galaxies and stars). If the primary content of the universe is inert matter, as in the dust models popular for much of the 20th century, there is a particular fate corresponding to each geometry. Hence cosmologists aimed to determine the fate of the universe by measuring $\Omega$, or equivalently the rate at which the expansion was decelerating.

=== Repulsive force ===
Starting in 1998, observations of supernovas in distant galaxies have been interpreted as consistent with a universe whose expansion is accelerating. Subsequent cosmological theorizing has been designed so as to allow for this possible acceleration, nearly always by invoking dark energy, which in its simplest form is just a positive cosmological constant. In general, dark energy is a catch-all term for any hypothesized field with negative pressure, usually with a density that changes as the universe expands. Some cosmologists are studying whether dark energy which varies in time (due to a portion of it being caused by a scalar field in the early universe) can solve the crisis in cosmology. Upcoming galaxy surveys from the Euclid, Nancy Grace Roman and James Webb space telescopes (and data from next-generation ground-based telescopes) are expected to further develop our understanding of dark energy (specifically whether it is best understood as a constant energy intrinsic to space, as a time varying quantum field or as something else entirely).

== Role of the shape of the universe ==
The ultimate fate of an expanding universe depends on the matter density $\Omega _M$ and the dark energy density $\Omega _\Lambda$.

The current scientific consensus of most cosmologists is that the ultimate fate of the universe depends on its overall shape, how much dark energy it contains and on the equation of state which determines how the dark energy density responds to the expansion of the universe. Recent observations conclude, from 7.5 billion years after the Big Bang, that the expansion rate of the universe has probably been increasing, commensurate with the Open Universe theory. However, measurements made by the Wilkinson Microwave Anisotropy Probe suggest that the universe is either flat or very close to flat.

=== Closed universe ===
If $\Omega > 1$, the geometry of space is closed like the surface of a sphere. The sum of the angles of a triangle exceeds 180 degrees and there are no parallel lines; all lines eventually meet. The geometry of the universe is, at least on a very large scale, elliptic.

In a closed universe, gravity eventually stops the expansion of the universe, after which it starts to contract until all matter in the universe collapses to a point, a final singularity termed the "Big Crunch", the opposite of the Big Bang. If, however, the universe contains dark energy, then the resulting repulsive force may be sufficient to cause the expansion of the universe to continue forever—even if $\Omega > 1$. This is the case in the currently accepted Lambda-CDM model, where dark energy is found through observations to account for roughly 68% of the total energy content of the universe. According to the Lambda-CDM model, the universe would need to have an average matter density roughly seventeen times greater than its measured value today in order for the effects of dark energy to be overcome and the universe to eventually collapse. This is in spite of the fact that, according to the Lambda-CDM model, any increase in matter density would result in $\Omega > 1$.

=== Open universe ===
If $\Omega < 1$, the geometry of space is open, i.e., negatively curved like the surface of a saddle. The angles of a triangle sum to less than 180 degrees, and lines that do not meet are never equidistant; they have a point of least distance and otherwise grow apart. The geometry of such a universe is hyperbolic.

Even without dark energy, a negatively curved universe expands forever, with gravity negligibly slowing the rate of expansion. With dark energy, the expansion not only continues but accelerates. The ultimate fate of an open universe with dark energy is either universal heat death or a "Big Rip" where the acceleration caused by dark energy eventually becomes so strong that it completely overwhelms the effects of the gravitational, electromagnetic and strong binding forces. Conversely, a negative cosmological constant, which would correspond to a negative energy density and positive pressure, would cause even an open universe to re-collapse to a big crunch.

=== Flat universe ===
If the average density of the universe exactly equals the critical density so that $\Omega = 1$, then the geometry of the universe is flat: as in Euclidean geometry, the sum of the angles of a triangle is 180 degrees and parallel lines continuously maintain the same distance. Measurements from the Wilkinson Microwave Anisotropy Probe have confirmed the universe is flat within a 0.4% margin of error.

In the absence of dark energy, a flat universe expands forever but at a continually decelerating rate, with expansion asymptotically approaching zero. With dark energy, the expansion rate of the universe initially slows, due to the effects of gravity, but eventually increases, and the ultimate fate of the universe becomes the same as that of an open universe.

== Theories about the end of the universe ==
The fate of the universe may be determined by its density. The preponderance of evidence to date, based on measurements of the rate of expansion and the mass density, favors a universe that will continue to expand indefinitely, resulting in the "Big Freeze" scenario below. However, observations are not conclusive, and alternative models are still possible.

=== Heat death or Big Freeze ===
The heat death of the universe, also known as the Big Freeze (or Big Chill), is a scenario under which continued expansion results in a universe that asymptotically approaches absolute zero temperature. Under this scenario, the universe eventually reaches a state of maximum entropy in which everything is evenly distributed and there are no energy gradients—which are needed to sustain information processing, one form of which is life. This scenario has gained ground as the most likely fate.

In this scenario, stars are expected to form normally for 10^{12} to 10^{14} (1–100 trillion) years, but eventually the supply of gas needed for star formation will be exhausted. As existing stars run out of fuel and cease to shine, the universe will slowly and inexorably grow darker. Eventually black holes will dominate the universe, but they will disappear over time as they emit Hawking radiation. Over infinite time, there could be a spontaneous entropy decrease by the Poincaré recurrence theorem, thermal fluctuations, and the fluctuation theorem.

The heat death scenario is compatible with any of the three spatial models, but it requires that the universe reaches an eventual temperature minimum. Without dark energy, it could occur only under a flat or hyperbolic geometry. With a positive cosmological constant, it could also occur in a closed universe.

==== Dyson's eternal intelligence ====
In his 1979 paper "Time Without End: Physics and Biology in an Open Universe," physicist Freeman Dyson proposed a scenario for the far future in which intelligent life could achieve a form of immortality by processing an infinite number of thoughts. This concept, known as "Dyson's eternal intelligence," was originally predicated on an open universe, a cosmological model that expands forever. In the context of a zero cosmological constant (a flat or open universe without dark energy), the universe would continue to cool as it expands, but at a decelerating rate. Dyson's idea was that intelligent beings could store a finite amount of energy and expend it in increasingly smaller fractions. After each expenditure of energy for thought processes, these beings would enter a state of hibernation for immense periods, allowing the universe to cool further. As the ambient temperature of the universe drops, the minimum energy required for a computation (a thought) also decreases, theoretically allowing for an infinite number of thoughts to be processed over an infinite subjective time, even with a finite energy reserve. However, this scenario faces challenges, as the discovery of an accelerating expansion, driven by a positive cosmological constant, suggests that the universe will not continue to cool indefinitely and distant regions will become causally disconnected, which would prevent the indefinite survival envisioned by Dyson.

=== Big Rip ===
The current Hubble constant defines a rate of acceleration of the universe not large enough to destroy local structures like galaxies, which are held together by gravity, but large enough to increase the space between them. A steady increase in the Hubble constant to infinity would result in all material objects in the universe, starting with galaxies and eventually (in a finite time) all forms, no matter how small, disintegrating into unbound elementary particles, radiation and beyond. As the energy density, scale factor and expansion rate become infinite, the universe ends as what is effectively a singularity.

In the special case of phantom dark energy, which has supposed negative kinetic energy that would result in a higher rate of acceleration than other cosmological constants predict, a more sudden big rip could occur.

=== Big Crunch ===
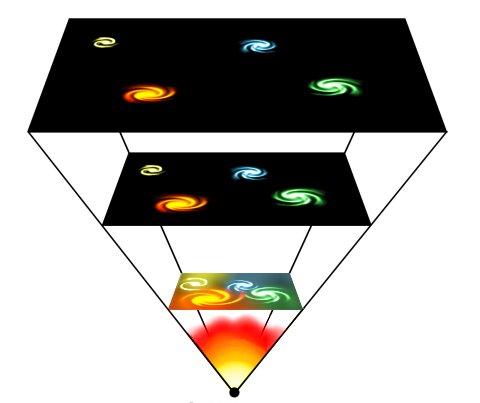
The Big Crunch. The vertical axis can be considered as expansion or contraction with time.

The Big Crunch hypothesis is a symmetric view of the ultimate fate of the universe. Just as the theorized Big Bang started as a cosmological expansion, this theory assumes that the average density of the universe will be enough to stop its expansion and the universe will begin contracting. The result is unknown; a simple estimation would have all the matter and spacetime in the universe collapse into a dimensionless singularity back into how the universe started with the Big Bang, but at these scales unknown quantum effects need to be considered (see Quantum gravity). Recent evidence suggests that this scenario is unlikely but has not been ruled out, as measurements have been available only over a relatively short period of time and could reverse in the future.

This scenario allows the Big Bang to occur immediately after the Big Crunch of a preceding universe. If this happens repeatedly, it creates a cyclic model, which is also known as an oscillatory universe. The universe could then consist of an infinite sequence of finite universes, with each finite universe ending with a Big Crunch that is also the Big Bang of the next universe. A problem with the cyclic universe is that it does not reconcile with the second law of thermodynamics, as entropy would build up from oscillation to oscillation and cause the eventual heat death of the universe. Current evidence also indicates the universe is not closed. This has caused cosmologists to abandon the oscillating universe model. A somewhat similar idea is embraced by the cyclic model, but this idea evades heat death because of an expansion of the branes that dilutes entropy accumulated in the previous cycle.

=== Big Bounce ===
The Big Bounce is a theorized scientific model related to the beginning of the known universe. It derives from the oscillatory universe or cyclic repetition interpretation of the Big Bang where the first cosmological event was the result of the collapse of a previous universe.

According to one version of the Big Bang theory of cosmology, in the beginning the universe was infinitely dense. Such a description seems to be at odds with other more widely accepted theories, especially quantum mechanics and its uncertainty principle. Therefore, quantum mechanics has given rise to an alternative version of the Big Bang theory, specifically that the universe tunneled into existence and had a finite density consistent with quantum mechanics, before evolving in a manner governed by classical physics. Also, if the universe is closed, this theory would predict that once this universe collapses it will spawn another universe in an event similar to the Big Bang after a universal singularity is reached or a repulsive quantum force causes re-expansion.

In simple terms, this theory states that the universe will continuously repeat the cycle of a Big Bang, followed by a Big Crunch.

=== Cosmic uncertainty ===
Each possibility described so far is based on a simple form of the dark energy equation of state. However, as the name implies, little is now known about the physics of dark energy. If the theory of inflation is true, the universe went through an episode dominated by a different form of dark energy in the first moments of the Big Bang, but inflation ended, indicating an equation of state more complex than those assumed for present-day dark energy. It is possible that the dark energy equation of state could change again, resulting in an event that would have consequences which are difficult to predict or parameterize. As the nature of dark energy and dark matter remain enigmatic, even hypothetical, the possibilities surrounding their role in the universe are unknown.

== Other possible fates of the universe ==
There are also some possible events, such as the Big Slurp, which would seriously harm the universe, although the universe as a whole would not be completely destroyed as a result.

=== Big Slurp ===
This theory posits that the universe exists in a false vacuum and that it could become a true vacuum at any moment.

The Higgs field which permeates the universe is much like an electromagnetic field: it varies in strength based upon its potential. A true vacuum exists so long as the universe exists in its lowest energy state, in which case the false vacuum theory is irrelevant. However, if the vacuum is not in its lowest energy state (a false vacuum), it could tunnel into a lower-energy state, otherwise known as vacuum decay. This has the potential to fundamentally alter the universe: in some scenarios, even the various physical constants could have different values, severely affecting the foundations of matter, energy, and spacetime. It is also possible that all structures will be destroyed instantaneously, without any forewarning.

However, only a portion of the universe would be destroyed by the Big Slurp while most of the universe would still be unaffected because galaxies located further than 4.2 gigaparsecs (13 billion light-years) away from each other are moving away from each other faster than the speed of light while the Big Slurp itself cannot expand faster than the speed of light. To place this in context, the size of the observable universe is currently about 46 billion light years in all directions from Earth.

== Observational constraints on theories ==
Choosing among these rival scenarios is done by 'weighing' the universe, for example, measuring the relative contributions of matter, radiation, dark matter, and dark energy to the critical density. More concretely, competing scenarios are evaluated against data on galaxy clustering and distant supernovas, and on the anisotropies in the cosmic microwave background.

== See also ==
- Alan Guth
- Andrei Linde
- Anthropic principle
- Arrow of time
- Cosmological horizon
- Cyclic model
- General relativity
- Holocene extinction
- Human extinction
- Future of Earth
- John D. Barrow
- Kardashev scale
- Multiverse
- Shape of the universe
- Timeline of the far future
- Zero-energy universe
