= Phantom dark energy =

Hypothetical form of dark energy

In cosmology, phantom dark energy is a hypothetical form of dark energy. It possesses negative kinetic energy, and predicts expansion of the universe in excess of that predicted by a cosmological constant, which leads to a Big Rip. The idea of phantom dark energy is often dismissed, as it would suggest that the vacuum is unstable with negative mass particles bursting into existence. The concept is hence tied to emerging theories of a continuously created negative mass dark fluid, in which the cosmological constant can vary as a function of time. It is a special type of quintessence.

The term was coined by Robert R. Caldwell in 1999.

== Equation of state ==
In cosmology, the equation of state of a perfect fluid is given by

$$p = w \rho,$$

where p is the pressure, ρ is the energy density and w is the ratio between the two. For normal baryonic matter $w = 0$ and for a cosmological constant $w = -1$. Phantom dark energy is defined as having $w <-1$.

== Big Rip mechanism ==
The existence of phantom dark energy could cause the expansion of the universe to accelerate so quickly that a scenario known as the Big Rip, a possible end to the universe, occurs. As the universe expands, the phantom energy density increases, further accelerating the cosmic expansion in a feedback loop that drives the scale factor to infinity in finite time. All structures are ripped apart, even atoms and nuclei, as each particle becomes causally disconnected from all others.

One application of phantom dark energy in 2007 was to a cyclic model of the universe, which reverses its expansion extremely shortly before the would-be Big Rip. This cyclic model can be more complicated if the mass–energy of every point in the universe is dense enough to collapse into black hole core substance that will bounce after reaching a maximum threshold of compression causing the next big bang (the overall scenario is highly unlikely).

== Possible evidence ==
In 2025, the Dark Energy Spectroscopic Instrument (DESI) collaboration, published a survey on baryon acoustic oscillations. They found violations of the standard model of cosmology, the Lambda-CDM model, within 4 standard deviations. They reported acceleration of the universe that was stronger in the past, suggesting the presence of phantom dark energy in the early universe.

== See also ==
- Quintom scenario
