= Infinite growth =

Infinite growth may refer to:

- An ever expanding universe
- Infinite economic growth
- Infinite mathematical growth, such as unlimited exponential growth that approaches infinity

== See also ==
- Thermal runaway – Loss of control of an exothermal process due to temperature increases
