= Quintom scenario =

Hypothetical form of dark energy

The Quintom scenario was proposed in 2004 by Xin-Min Zhang et al., and is a hypothetical model of dark energy. The name of 'quintom' was derived from 'quintessence' from quintessence field and 'phantom' from phantom dark energy. The Quintom scenario was to fit the evolution of dark energy with the cosmological data.

== Equation of state ==
In this scenario, the equation of state (EoS) $\omega = p/\rho$ of the dark energy, relating its pressure and energy density, can cross the boundary $\omega = -1$ associated with the cosmological constant. The boundary separates the phantom-energy-like behavior with $\omega < -1$ from the quintessence-like behavior with $\omega > -1$.

According to a no-go theorem, a single-field, single-fluid scalar model cannot cross $\omega = -1$. Achieving such a crossing requires at least two degrees of freedom in dark energy models built from ideal fluids or scalar fields. To allow the effective equation of state to cross $-1$, possible approaches include:

- Multiple fields & extra degrees of freedom, e.g. additional scalar fields or fermion fields;
- Higher-order derivative terms, e.g. Galileon theory;
- Modified gravities, e.g. $f(R)$, $f(T)$, $f(Q)$ gravity, metric-affine theory, or Horndeski gravity;
- Matter-dark energy interactions, e.g. interacting dark sector;
- Extra dimension effects, e.g. DGP gravity.

The Quintom scenario was applied in 2008 to produce a model of inflationary cosmology with a Big Bounce instead of a Big Bang singularity.

== Observational evidence ==
Current cosmological observations have given a clue in favor of the Quintom scenario. Since 2024, DESI has released the first year data and provided a possible "Quintom-B" scenario, with the equation of state crossing the boundary from below to above. The DESI data release 2 shows a deviation from the ΛCDM model compared with dynamical dark energy, preferring a Quintom-B behavior crossing $\omega = -1$ from below to above.
