= Heat death of the universe =

Possible fate of the universe

The heat death of the universe (also known as the Big Chill or the Big Freeze) is a scientific hypothesis regarding the ultimate fate of the universe which posits the universe will evolve to a state of no thermodynamic free energy and, having reached maximum entropy, will therefore be unable to sustain any further thermodynamic processes. Heat death does not imply any particular absolute temperature; it only requires that temperature differences or other processes may no longer be exploited to perform work. In the language of physics, this is when the universe reaches thermodynamic equilibrium.

If the curvature of the universe is hyperbolic or flat, or if dark energy is a positive cosmological constant, the universe will continue expanding forever, and a heat death is expected to occur, with the universe cooling to approach equilibrium at a very low temperature after a long time period.

The theory of heat death stems from the ideas of Lord Kelvin who, in the 1850s, took the theory of heat as mechanical energy loss in nature (as embodied in the first two laws of thermodynamics) and extrapolated it to larger processes on a universal scale. This also allowed Kelvin to formulate the heat death paradox, which disproves an infinitely old universe.

== Origins of the idea ==
The idea of heat death stems from the second law of thermodynamics, of which one version states that entropy tends to increase in an isolated system. From this, the hypothesis implies that if the universe lasts for a sufficient time, it will asymptotically approach a state where all energy is evenly distributed. In other words, according to this hypothesis, there is a tendency in nature towards the dissipation (energy transformation) of mechanical energy (motion) into thermal energy; hence, by extrapolation, there exists the view that, in time, the mechanical movement of the universe will run down as work is converted to heat because of the second law.

The conjecture that all bodies in the universe cool off, eventually becoming too cold to support life, seems to have been first put forward by the French astronomer Jean Sylvain Bailly in 1777 in his writings on the history of astronomy and in the ensuing correspondence with Voltaire. In Bailly's view, all planets have an internal heat and are now at some particular stage of cooling. Venus, for instance, is still too hot for life to arise there for thousands of years, while Mars is already too cold. The final state, in this view, is described as one of "equilibrium" in which all motion ceases.

The idea of heat death as a consequence of the laws of thermodynamics, however, was first proposed in loose terms beginning in 1851 by Lord Kelvin (William Thomson), who theorized further on the mechanical energy loss views of Sadi Carnot (1824), James Joule (1843) and Rudolf Clausius (1850). Thomson's views were then elaborated over the next decade by Hermann von Helmholtz and William Rankine.

=== History ===
The idea of the heat death of the universe derives from discussion of the application of the first two laws of thermodynamics to universal processes. Specifically, in 1851, Lord Kelvin outlined the view, as based on recent experiments on the dynamical theory of heat: "heat is not a substance, but a dynamical form of mechanical effect, we perceive that there must be an equivalence between mechanical work and heat, as between cause and effect."

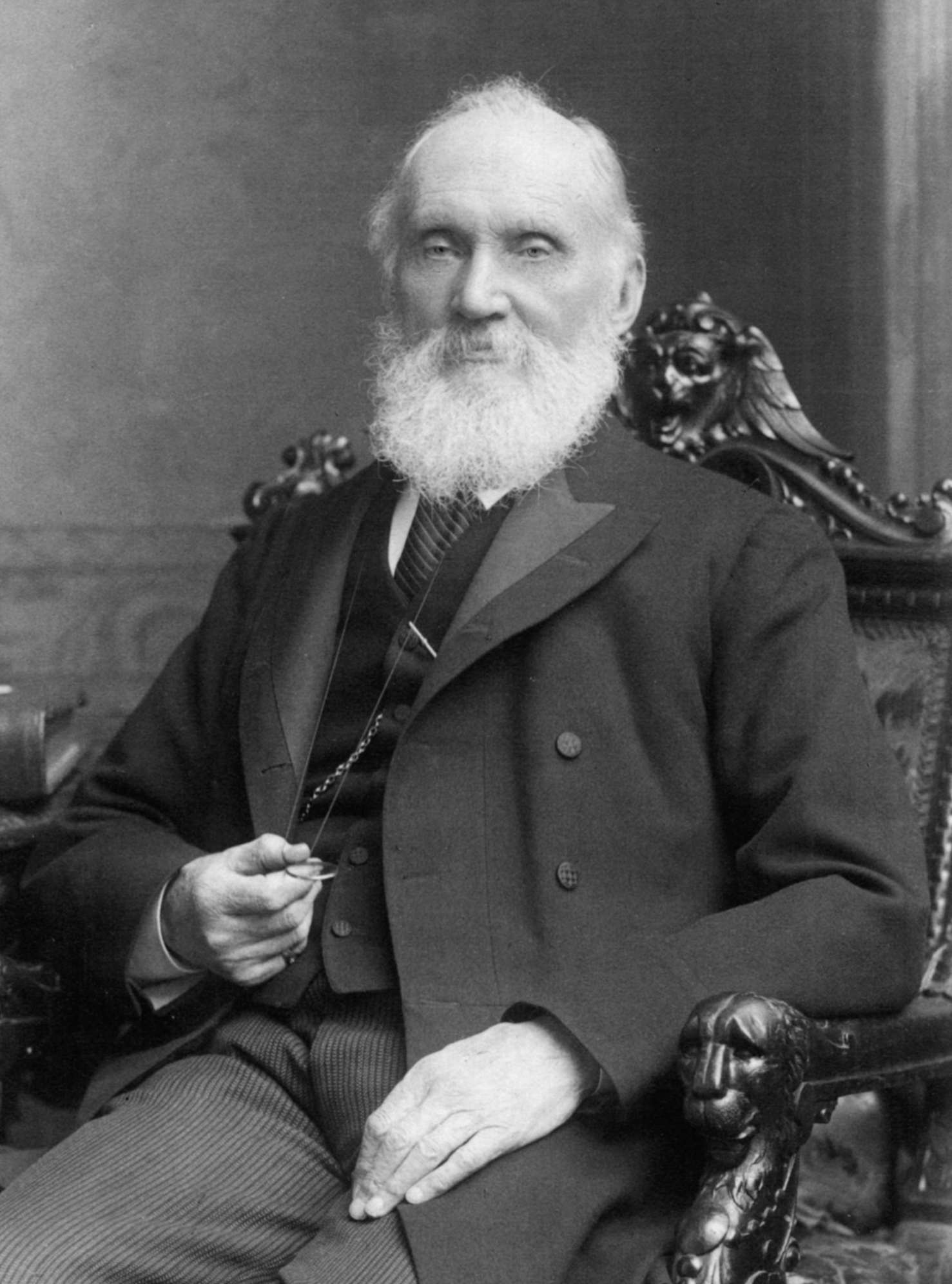
Lord Kelvin originated the idea of universal heat death in 1852.

In 1852, Thomson published On a Universal Tendency in Nature to the Dissipation of Mechanical Energy, in which he outlined the rudiments of the second law of thermodynamics summarized by the view that mechanical motion and the energy used to create that motion will naturally tend to dissipate or run down. The ideas in this paper, in relation to their application to the age of the Sun and the dynamics of the universal operation, attracted the likes of William Rankine and Hermann von Helmholtz. The three of them were said to have exchanged ideas on this subject. In 1862, Thomson published "On the age of the Sun's heat", an article in which he reiterated his fundamental beliefs in the indestructibility of energy (the first law) and the universal dissipation of energy (the second law), leading to diffusion of heat, cessation of useful motion (work), and exhaustion of potential energy, "lost irrecoverably" through the material universe, while clarifying his view of the consequences for the universe as a whole. Thomson wrote:

The result would inevitably be a state of universal rest and death, if the universe were finite and left to obey existing laws. But it is impossible to conceive a limit to the extent of matter in the universe; and therefore science points rather to an endless progress, through an endless space, of action involving the transformation of potential energy into palpable motion and hence into heat, than to a single finite mechanism, running down like a clock, and stopping for ever.

The clock's example shows how Kelvin was unsure whether the universe would eventually achieve thermodynamic equilibrium. Thomson later speculated that restoring the dissipated energy in "vis viva" and then usable work—and therefore revert the clock's direction, resulting in a "rejuvenating universe"—would require "a creative act or an act possessing similar power". Starting from this publication, Kelvin also introduced the heat death paradox (Kelvin's paradox), which challenged the classical concept of an infinitely old universe, since the universe has not achieved its thermodynamic equilibrium, thus further work and entropy production are still possible. The existence of stars and temperature differences can be considered an empirical proof that the universe is not infinitely old.

In the years to follow both Thomson's 1852 and the 1862 papers, Helmholtz and Rankine both credited Thomson with the idea, along with his paradox, but read further into his papers by publishing views stating that Thomson argued that the universe will end in a "heat death" (Helmholtz), which will be the "end of all physical phenomena" (Rankine).

== Current status ==
Proposals about the final state of the universe depend on the assumptions made about its ultimate fate, and these assumptions have varied considerably over the late 20th century and early 21st century. In a theorized "open" or "flat" universe that continues expanding indefinitely, either a heat death or a Big Rip is expected to eventually occur. If the cosmological constant is zero, the universe will approach absolute zero temperature over a very long timescale. However, if the cosmological constant is positive, the temperature will asymptote to a non-zero positive value, and the universe will approach a state of maximum entropy in which no further work is possible.

Thermodynamic heat death is a classical-physics concept, but has been extended to quantum physics. Even when thermodynamic entropy has reached its maximum, other quantities such as quantum circuit complexity continue to increase, eventually also reaching a maximum value.

== Time frame for heat death ==
The theory suggests that from the "Big Bang" through the present day, matter and dark matter in the universe are thought to have been concentrated in stars, galaxies, and galaxy clusters, and are presumed to continue to do so well into the future. Therefore, the universe is not in thermodynamic equilibrium, and objects can do physical work.^{:§VID} The decay time for a supermassive black hole of roughly 1 galaxy mass (10^{11} solar masses) because of Hawking radiation is in the order of 10^{100} years, so entropy can be produced until at least that time. Some large black holes in the universe are predicted to continue to grow up to perhaps 10^{14} M_{☉} during the collapse of superclusters of galaxies. Even these would evaporate over a timescale of up to 10^{106} years. After that time, the universe enters the so-called Dark Era and is expected to consist chiefly of a dilute gas of photons and leptons.^{:§VIA} With only very diffuse matter remaining, activity in the universe will have tailed off dramatically, with extremely low energy levels and extremely long timescales. Speculatively, it is possible that the universe may enter a second inflationary epoch, or assuming that the current vacuum state is a false vacuum, the vacuum may decay into a lower-energy state.^{:§VE} It is also possible that entropy production will cease and the universe will reach heat death.^{:§VID}

It has been hypothesized that, over vast periods of time, a spontaneous entropy decrease could eventually occur via the Poincaré recurrence theorem, thermal fluctuations, and fluctuation theorem. Through this, another Big Bang could possibly create a new universe similar to the current one by quantum fluctuations and quantum tunnelling in roughly $10^{10^{10^{56}}}$ years.

== Opposing views ==
Max Planck wrote that the phrase "entropy of the universe" has no meaning because it admits of no accurate definition. In 2008, Walter Grandy wrote: "It is rather presumptuous to speak of the entropy of a universe about which we still understand so little, and we wonder how one might define thermodynamic entropy for a universe and its major constituents that have never been in equilibrium in their entire existence." According to László Tisza, "If an isolated system is not in equilibrium, we cannot associate an entropy with it." Hans Adolf Buchdahl writes of "the entirely unjustifiable assumption that the universe can be treated as a closed thermodynamic system". According to Giovanni Gallavotti, "there is no universally accepted notion of entropy for systems out of equilibrium, even when in a stationary state". Discussing the question of entropy for non-equilibrium states in general, Elliott H. Lieb and Jakob Yngvason express their opinion as follows: "Despite the fact that most physicists believe in such a nonequilibrium entropy, it has so far proved impossible to define it in a clearly satisfactory way." In Peter Landsberg's opinion: "The third misconception is that thermodynamics, and in particular, the concept of entropy, can without further enquiry be applied to the whole universe. ... These questions have a certain fascination, but the answers are speculations."

A 2010 analysis of entropy states, "The entropy of a general gravitational field is still not known", and "gravitational entropy is difficult to quantify". The analysis considers several possible assumptions that would be needed for estimates and suggests that the observable universe has more entropy than previously thought. This is because the analysis concludes that supermassive black holes are the largest contributor. Lee Smolin goes further: "It has long been known that gravity is important for keeping the universe out of thermal equilibrium. Gravitationally bound systems have negative specific heat—that is, the velocities of their components increase when energy is removed. ... Such a system does not evolve toward a homogeneous equilibrium state. Instead it becomes increasingly structured and heterogeneous as it fragments into subsystems." This point of view is also supported by the fact of a recent experimental discovery of a stable non-equilibrium steady state in a relatively simple closed system. It should be expected that an isolated system fragmented into subsystems does not necessarily come to thermodynamic equilibrium and remain in non-equilibrium steady state. Entropy will be transmitted from one subsystem to another, but its production will be zero, which does not contradict the second law of thermodynamics.

== Philosophical views ==
The discovery of the principle of the heat death of the universe led to philosophical reevaluation of the place of man in the universe. In 1856, Hermann von Helmholtz suggested that it compelled humans to complete a moral destiny. Philipp Mainländer, another philosopher whose 1875 work Die Philosophie der Erlösung has been associated with the philosophy of pandeism, saw the expected heat death of the Universe as "a different, redemptive destiny for humanity: an end of suffering".

== In popular culture ==
In Isaac Asimov's 1956 short story The Last Question, humans through the ages repeatedly wonder how the heat death of the universe can be avoided.

In the 1981 Doctor Who story "Logopolis", the Doctor realizes that the Logopolitans have created vents in the universe to expel accumulated entropy into other universes—"Charged Vacuum Emboitments" or "CVE"—to delay the demise of our universe. The Doctor unwittingly travels through such a vent in "Full Circle".

In the 2011 anime series Puella Magi Madoka Magica, the antagonist Kyubey reveals he is a member of an alien race who has been creating magical girls for millennia in order to harvest their energy to combat entropy and stave off the heat death of the universe.

In the last act of Final Fantasy XIV: Endwalker, the player encounters an alien race known as the Ea who have lost all hope in the future and any desire to live further, all because they have learned of the eventual heat death of the universe and see everything else as pointless due to its probable inevitability.

The overarching plot of the Xeelee Sequence concerns the Photino Birds' efforts to accelerate the heat death of the universe by accelerating the rate at which stars become white dwarfs.

The 2019 video game Outer Wilds has several themes grappling with the idea of the heat death of the universe, and the theory that the universe is a cycle of big bangs once the previous one has experienced a heat death.

"Singularity Immemorial", the seventh main story event of the mobile game Girls' Frontline: Neural Cloud, concerns a virtual sector made to simulate space exploration and the threat of the heat death of the universe. The simulation uses an imitation of Neural Cloud's virus entities known as the Entropics as a stand in for the effects of a heat death.

In the 2024 video game expansion Destiny 2 Lightfall, the antagonist called the Witness strives to eliminate the universe's entropy. Its goal is to create a universe that is in an eternal motionless state.

== See also ==
- Arrow of time – Concept in physics of one-way time
- Big Bang – Physical theory of the cosmos
- Big Bounce – Model for the origin of the universe
- Big Crunch – Hypothetical scenario for the ultimate fate of the universe
- Big Rip – Cosmological model
- Chronology of the universe – History and future of the universe
- Cyclic model – Cosmological models involving indefinite, self-sustaining cycles
- Entropy (arrow of time) – Use of the second law of thermodynamics to distinguish past from future
- Fluctuation theorem – Theorem in statistical mathematics
- Heat death paradox – Paradox relating to fate of universe
- The Last Question – 1956 science-fiction short story by Isaac Asimov
- Timeline of the far future – Scientific projections regarding the far future
- Orders of magnitude (time) – Comparison of a wide range of timescales
- Thermodynamic temperature – Measure of temperature relative to absolute zero
- Ultimate fate of the universe – Theories about the end of the universe
- Zero-energy universe – Hypothesis that the total amount of energy in the universe is exactly zero
