= Robert R. Caldwell =

American theoretical physicist

- Education: Washington University in St. Louis (A.B.); University of Wisconsin-Milwaukee (Ph.D.)
- Known for: Phantom dark energy
- Scientific career
- Fields: Theoretical physics, Cosmology
- Workplaces: Dartmouth College
- Doctoral advisor: Bruce Allen

Robert R. Caldwell is an American theoretical physicist and professor of physics and astronomy at Dartmouth College. His research interests include cosmology and gravitation. He is known primarily for his work on theories of cosmic acceleration, in particular dark energy, quintessence, and the Big Rip scenario.

He coined the term phantom dark energy.

== Career ==
Caldwell received an A.B. from Washington University in St. Louis in physics and French in 1987, and a Ph.D. from the University of Wisconsin-Milwaukee in 1992. He was a postdoctoral fellow at Fermilab (1992–4), the University of Cambridge (1994–6, as a member of Hawking's group), the University of Pennsylvania (1996–8), and Princeton University (1998–2000). He has been on the faculty of Dartmouth College as an assistant professor (2000), associate professor (2005), and full professor (2010). He was elected Fellow of the American Physical Society in 2008.
