= Quintessence (physics) =

Hypothetical fundamental force

In physics, quintessence is a hypothetical form of dark energy, more precisely a scalar field minimally coupled to gravity, postulated as an explanation of the observation of an accelerating rate of expansion of the universe. The first example of this scenario was proposed by Bharat Ratra and Jim Peebles (1988) and Christof Wetterich (1988). The concept was expanded to more general types of time-varying dark energy, and the term "quintessence" was first introduced in a 1998 paper by Robert R. Caldwell, Rahul Dave and Paul Steinhardt. It has been proposed by some physicists to be a fifth fundamental force. Quintessence differs from the cosmological constant explanation of dark energy in that it is dynamic; that is, it changes over time, unlike the cosmological constant which, by definition, does not change. Quintessence can be either attractive or repulsive depending on the ratio of its kinetic and potential energy. Those working with this postulate believe that quintessence became repulsive about ten billion years ago, about 3.5 billion years after the Big Bang.

A group of researchers argued in 2021 that observations of the Hubble tension may imply that only quintessence models with a nonzero coupling constant are viable.

== Terminology ==
The name comes from quinta essentia (fifth element). So called in Latin starting from the Middle Ages, this was the (first) element added by Aristotle to the other four ancient classical elements because he thought it was the essence of the celestial world. Aristotle posited it to be a pure, fine, and primigenial element which he referred to as aether in his text On the Heavens. Similarly, modern quintessence would be the fifth known "dynamical, time-dependent, and spatially inhomogeneous" contribution to the overall mass–energy content of the universe.

Of course, the other four components are not the ancient Greek classical elements, but rather "baryons, neutrinos, dark matter, [and] radiation." Although neutrinos are sometimes considered radiation, the term "radiation" in this context is only used to refer to massless photons. Spatial curvature of the cosmos (which has not been detected) is excluded because it is non-dynamical and homogeneous; the cosmological constant would not be considered a fifth component in this sense, because it is non-dynamical, homogeneous, and time-independent.

== Scalar field ==
Quintessence (Q) is a scalar field with an equation of state where w_{q}, the ratio of pressure p_{q} and density $\rho$_{q}, is given by the potential energy $V(Q)$ and a kinetic term:

$$w_q=\frac{p_q}{\rho_q}=\frac{\frac{1}{2}\dot{Q}^2-V(Q)}{\frac{1}{2}\dot{Q}^2+V(Q)}$$

Hence, quintessence is dynamic, and generally has a density and w_{q} parameter that varies with time. Specifically, w_{q} parameter can vary within the range [-1,1]. By contrast, a cosmological constant is static, with a fixed energy density and w_{q} = −1.

== Tracker behavior ==
Many models of quintessence have a tracker behavior, which according to Ratra and Peebles (1988) and Paul Steinhardt et al. (1999) partly solves the cosmological constant problem. In these models, the quintessence field has a density which closely tracks (but is less than) the radiation density until matter-radiation equality, which triggers quintessence to start having characteristics similar to dark energy, eventually dominating the universe. This naturally sets the low scale of the dark energy. When comparing the predicted expansion rate of the universe as given by the tracker solutions with cosmological data, a main feature of tracker solutions is that one needs four parameters to properly describe the behavior of their equation of state, whereas it has been shown that at most a two-parameter model can optimally be constrained by mid-term future data (horizon 2015–2020).

== Specific models ==
Some special cases of quintessence are phantom dark energy, in which w_{q} < −1, and k-essence (short for kinetic quintessence), which has a non-standard form of kinetic energy. If this type of energy were to exist, it would cause a Big Rip in the universe due to the growing energy density of dark energy, which would cause the expansion of the universe to increase at a faster-than-exponential rate.

=== Holographic dark energy ===
Holographic dark energy models, compared with cosmological constant models, imply a high degeneracy. It has been suggested that dark energy might originate from quantum fluctuations of spacetime, and is limited by the event horizon of the universe.

Studies with quintessence dark energy found that it dominates gravitational collapse in a spacetime simulation, based on the holographic thermalization. These results show that the smaller the state parameter of quintessence is, the harder it is for the plasma to thermalize.

== See also ==
- Aether (classical element)
- Phantom dark energy
- Quintom
