= Dark energy =

Energy driving the accelerated expansion of the universe

In physical cosmology and astronomy, dark energy is a proposed form of energy that affects the universe on its largest scales. Its primary effect is to drive the accelerating expansion of the universe. It also slows the rate of structure formation. Assuming that the lambda-CDM model of cosmology is correct, dark energy dominates the universe, contributing 68% of the total mass-energy in the present-day observable universe while dark matter and ordinary (baryonic) matter contribute 27% and 5%, respectively, and other components such as neutrinos and photons are nearly negligible. Dark energy's density is very low: 7×10^{−30} g/cm^{3} (6×10^{−10} J/m^{3} in mass-energy), much lower than the density of ordinary matter or dark matter within galaxies. However, it dominates the universe's mass–energy content because it is uniform across space.

The first observational evidence for dark energy's existence came from measurements of supernovae. Type Ia supernovae have constant luminosity, which means they can be used to accurately measure distances. Comparing this distance to the redshift (which measures the speed at which the supernova is receding) shows that the universe's expansion is accelerating. Prior to this observation, scientists thought that the gravitational attraction of matter and energy in the universe would cause the universe's expansion to slow over time. Since the discovery of accelerating expansion, several independent lines of evidence have been discovered that support the existence of dark energy.

The exact nature of dark energy remains a mystery, and many possible explanations have been theorized. The main candidates are a cosmological constant (representing a constant energy density filling space homogeneously) and scalar fields (dynamic quantities having energy densities that vary in time and space) such as quintessence or moduli. A cosmological constant would remain constant across time and space, while scalar fields can vary. Yet other possibilities are interacting dark energy (see the section § Theories of dark energy), an observational effect, cosmological coupling, and shockwave cosmology (see the section § Alternatives to dark energy).

== History of discovery and previous speculation ==
=== Einstein's cosmological constant ===
The "cosmological constant" is the simplest candidate for dark energy. It is a constant term that can be added to the Einstein field equations of general relativity. If considered as a "source term" in the field equation, it can be viewed as equivalent to the mass of empty space (which conceptually could be either positive or negative), or "vacuum energy".

The cosmological constant was first proposed by Einstein as a mechanism to obtain a solution to the gravitational field equation that would lead to a static universe, effectively using dark energy to balance gravity. Einstein gave the cosmological constant the symbol Λ (capital lambda). Einstein stated that the cosmological constant required that 'empty space takes the role of gravitating negative masses that are distributed all over the interstellar space'.

The mechanism was an example of fine-tuning, and it was later realized that Einstein's static universe would not be stable: local inhomogeneities would ultimately lead to either the runaway expansion or contraction of the universe. The equilibrium is unstable: if the universe expands slightly, then the expansion releases vacuum energy, which causes yet more expansion. Likewise, a universe that contracts slightly will continue contracting. According to Einstein, "empty space" can possess its own energy. Because this energy is a property of space itself, it would not be diluted as space expands. As more space comes into existence, more of this energy-of-space would appear, thereby causing accelerated expansion. These sorts of disturbances are inevitable, due to the uneven distribution of matter throughout the universe. Further, observations made by Edwin Hubble in 1929 showed that the universe appears to be expanding and is not static. Einstein reportedly referred to his failure to predict the idea of a dynamic universe, in contrast to a static universe, as his greatest blunder.

=== Inflationary dark energy ===
Alan Guth and Alexei Starobinsky proposed in 1980 that a negative pressure field, similar in concept to dark energy, could drive cosmic inflation in the very early universe. Inflation postulates that some repulsive force, qualitatively similar to dark energy, resulted in an enormous and exponential expansion of the universe during its earliest stages. Such expansion is an essential feature of most current models of the Big Bang. However, inflation must have occurred at a much higher energy density than the dark energy we observe today, and inflation is thought to have completely ended when the universe was just a fraction of a second old. It is unclear what relation, if any, exists between dark energy and inflation. Even after inflationary models became accepted, the cosmological constant was thought to be irrelevant to the current universe.

=== Late-time dark energy ===
Nearly all inflation models predict that the total (matter+energy) density of the universe should be very close to the critical density. During the 1980s, most cosmological research focused on models with critical density in matter only, usually 95% cold dark matter (CDM) and 5% ordinary matter (baryons). These models were found to be successful at forming realistic galaxies and clusters, but some problems appeared in the late 1980s: in particular, the model required a value for the Hubble constant lower than preferred by observations, and the model under-predicted observations of large-scale galaxy clustering. These difficulties became stronger after the discovery of anisotropy in the cosmic microwave background by the COBE spacecraft in 1992, and several modified CDM models came under active study through the mid-1990s: these included the Lambda-CDM model and a mixed cold/hot dark matter model. The first direct evidence for dark energy came from supernova observations in 1998 of accelerated expansion in Riess et al. and in Perlmutter et al., and the Lambda-CDM model then became the leading model. Soon after, dark energy was supported by independent observations: in 2000, the BOOMERanG and Maxima cosmic microwave background experiments observed the first acoustic peak in the cosmic microwave background, showing that the total (matter+energy) density is close to 100% of critical density. Then in 2001, the 2dF Galaxy Redshift Survey gave strong evidence that the matter density is around 30% of critical. The large difference between these two supports a smooth component of dark energy making up the difference. Much more precise measurements from WMAP in 2003–2010 have continued to support the standard model and give more accurate measurements of the key parameters.

The term "dark energy" was coined by cosmologist Michael S. Turner in 1998 for a paper written with Saul Perlmutter and Martin White.

== Nature ==
The nature of dark energy is more hypothetical than that of dark matter, and many things about it remain in the realm of speculation. Dark energy is thought to be very homogeneous and not dense, and is not known to interact through any of the fundamental forces other than gravity. Since it is rarefied and un-massive—roughly 10^{−27} kg/m^{3}—it is unlikely to be detectable in laboratory experiments. The reason dark energy can have such a profound effect on the universe, making up 68% of universal density in spite of being so dilute, is that it is believed to uniformly fill otherwise empty space.

The vacuum energy, that is, the particle–antiparticle pairs generated and mutually annihilated within a time frame in accord with Heisenberg's uncertainty principle in the energy–time formulation, has been often invoked as the main contribution to dark energy. The mass–energy equivalence postulated by general relativity implies that the vacuum energy should exert a gravitational force. Hence, the vacuum energy is expected to contribute to the cosmological constant, which in turn impinges on the accelerated expansion of the universe. However, the cosmological constant problem asserts that there is a huge disagreement between the observed values of vacuum energy density and the theoretical large value of zero-point energy obtained by quantum field theory; the problem remains unresolved.

Independently of its actual nature, dark energy would need to have a strong negative pressure to explain the observed acceleration of the expansion of the universe. According to general relativity, the pressure within a substance contributes to its gravitational attraction for other objects just as its mass density does. This happens because the physical quantity that causes matter to generate gravitational effects is the stress–energy tensor, which contains both the energy (or matter) density of a substance and its pressure. In the Friedmann–Lemaître–Robertson–Walker metric, it can be shown that a strong constant negative pressure (i.e., tension) in all the universe causes an acceleration in the expansion if the universe is already expanding, or a deceleration in contraction if the universe is already contracting. This accelerating expansion effect is sometimes labeled "gravitational repulsion".

=== Technical definition ===
In standard cosmology, there are three components of the universe: matter, radiation, and dark energy. Matter is anything whose energy density scales with the inverse cube of the scale factor, i.e., ρ ∝ a^{−3}, while radiation is anything whose energy density scales to the inverse fourth power of the scale factor (ρ ∝ a^{−4}). This can be understood intuitively: for an ordinary particle in a cube-shaped box, doubling the length of an edge of the box decreases the density (and hence energy density) by a factor of eight (2^{3}). For radiation, the decrease in energy density is greater, because an increase in spatial distance also causes a redshift and hence a decrease in energy (c.f. the Planck relation).

The final component is dark energy: it is an intrinsic property of space and has a constant energy density, regardless of the dimensions of the volume under consideration (ρ ∝ a^{0}). Thus, unlike ordinary matter, it is not diluted by the expansion of space.

=== Change in expansion over time ===
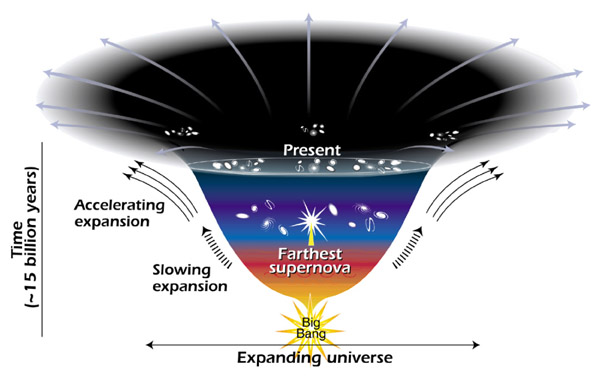
Diagram representing a proposed model for the accelerated expansion of the universe due to dark energy

High-precision measurements of the expansion of the universe are required to understand how the expansion rate changes over time and space. In general relativity, the evolution of the expansion rate is estimated from the curvature of the universe and the cosmological equation of state (the relationship between temperature, pressure, and combined matter, energy, and vacuum energy density for any region of space). Measuring the equation of state for dark energy is one of the biggest efforts in observational cosmology today. Adding the cosmological constant to cosmology's standard FLRW metric leads to the Lambda-CDM model, which has been referred to as the "standard model of cosmology" because of its precise agreement with observations.

As of 2026, the Lambda-CDM model is consistent with a series of increasingly rigorous cosmological observations, including the Planck spacecraft and the Supernova Legacy Survey (SNLS). First results from the SNLS reveal that the average behavior (i.e., equation of state) of dark energy behaves like Einstein's cosmological constant to a precision of 10%. Recent results from the Hubble Space Telescope Higher-Z Team indicate that dark energy has been present for at least 9 billion years and during the period preceding cosmic acceleration.

In March 2025, the Dark Energy Spectroscopic Instrument (DESI) collaboration announced that evidence for evolving dark energy has been discovered in analysis combining DESI data on baryon acoustic oscillations (BAO) with the CMB, weak lensing and supernovae dataset, with significance ranging from 2.8 to 4.2σ. Results suggest that the density of dark energy is slowly decreasing with time.

== Evidence of existence ==
The evidence for dark energy is indirect but comes from three independent sources:

- Distance measurements and their relation to redshift, which suggest the universe has expanded more in the latter half of its life than in the former half of its life.
- The theoretical need for a type of additional energy that is not matter or dark matter to form the observationally flat universe (absence of any detectable global curvature).
- Measurements of large-scale wave patterns of mass density in the universe.

=== Supernovae ===
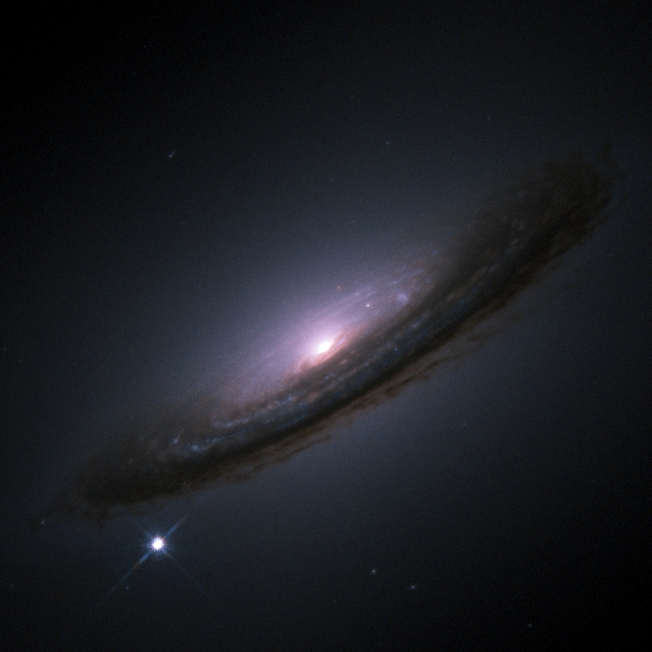
A Type Ia supernova (bright spot on the bottom-left) near NGC 4526

In 1998, the High-Z Supernova Search Team published observations of Type Ia ("one-A") supernovae. In 1999, the Supernova Cosmology Project followed by suggesting that the expansion of the universe is accelerating. The 2011 Nobel Prize in Physics was awarded to Saul Perlmutter, Brian P. Schmidt, and Adam G. Riess for their leadership in the discovery.

Since then, these observations have been corroborated by several independent sources. Measurements of the cosmic microwave background, gravitational lensing, and the large-scale structure of the cosmos, as well as improved measurements of supernovae, have been consistent with the Lambda-CDM model. Some people argue that the only indications for the existence of dark energy are observations of distance measurements and their associated redshifts. Cosmic microwave background anisotropies and baryon acoustic oscillations serve only to demonstrate that distances to a given redshift are larger than would be expected from a "dusty" Friedmann–Lemaître universe and the local measured Hubble constant.

Supernovae are useful for cosmology because they are excellent standard candles across cosmological distances. They allow researchers to measure the expansion history of the universe by looking at the relationship between the distance to an object and its redshift, which gives how fast it is receding from us. The relationship is roughly linear, according to Hubble's law. It is relatively easy to measure redshift, but finding the distance to an object is more difficult. Usually, astronomers use standard candles: objects for which the intrinsic brightness, or absolute magnitude, is known. This allows the object's distance to be measured from its actual observed brightness, or apparent magnitude. Type Ia supernovae are the most accurate known standard candles across cosmological distances because of their extreme and consistent luminosity.

Recent observations of supernovae are consistent with a universe made up of 66.6% dark energy and 33.4% of a combination of dark matter and baryonic matter assuming a flat Lambda-CDM model.

=== Large-scale structure ===
The theory of large-scale structure, which governs the formation of structures in the universe (stars, quasars, galaxies and galaxy groups and clusters), also suggests that the density of matter in the universe is only 30% of the critical density.

A 2011 survey, the WiggleZ galaxy survey of more than 200,000 galaxies, provided further evidence towards the existence of dark energy, although the exact physics behind it remains unknown. The WiggleZ survey from the Australian Astronomical Observatory scanned the galaxies to determine their redshift. Then, by exploiting the fact that baryon acoustic oscillations have left voids regularly of ≈150 Mpc diameter, surrounded by the galaxies, the voids were used as standard rulers to estimate distances to galaxies as far as 2,000 Mpc (redshift 0.6), allowing for an accurate estimate of the speeds of galaxies from their redshift and distance. The data confirmed cosmic acceleration up to half of the age of the universe (7 billion years) and constrain its inhomogeneity to 1 part in 10. This provides a confirmation to cosmic acceleration independent of supernovae.

=== Cosmic microwave background ===
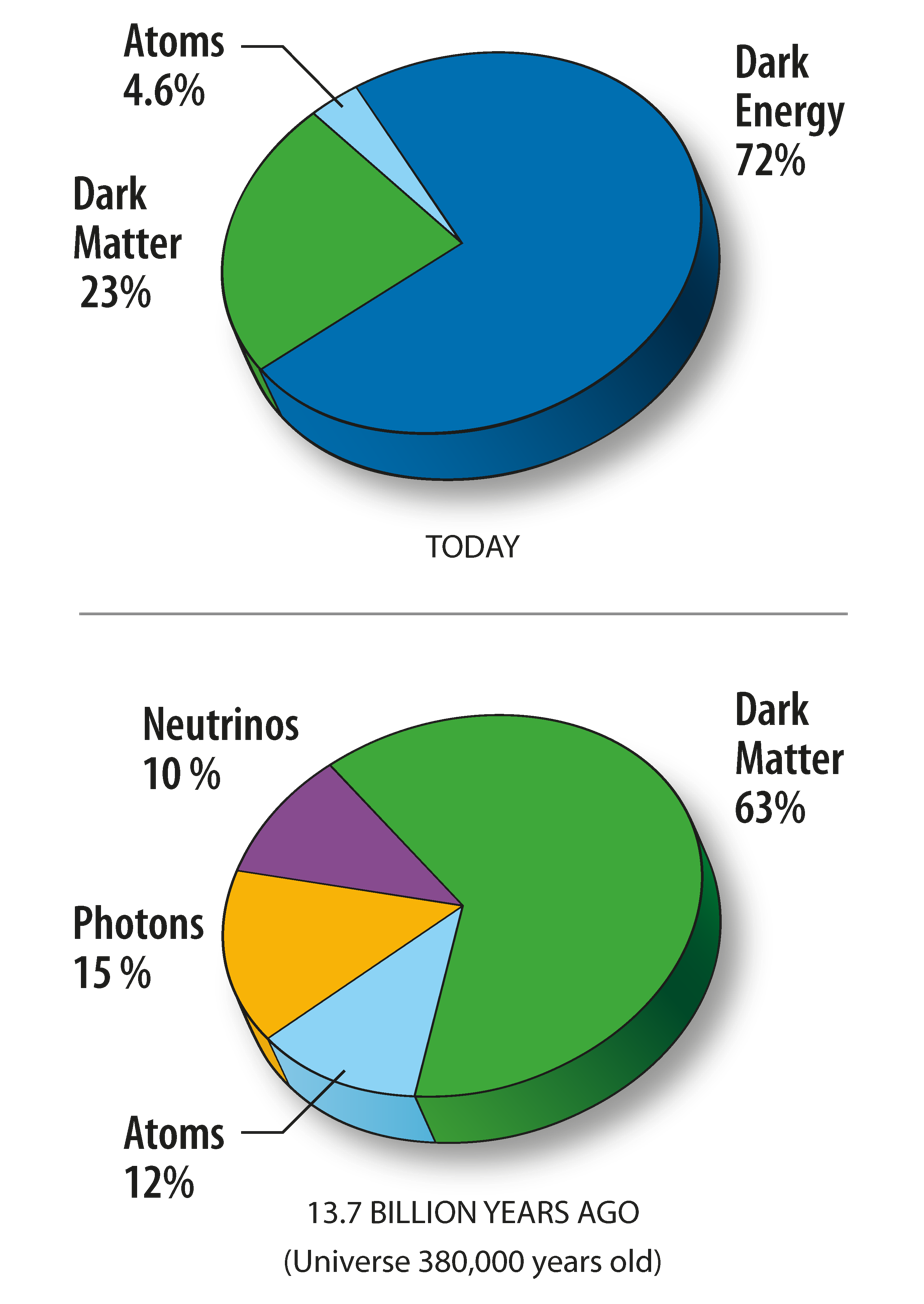
Estimated division of total energy in the universe into matter, dark matter and dark energy based on five years of WMAP data

The existence of dark energy, in whatever form, is needed to reconcile the measured geometry of space with the total amount of matter in the universe. Measurements of cosmic microwave background anisotropies indicate that the universe is close to flat. For the shape of the universe to be flat, the mass–energy density of the universe must be equal to the critical density. The total amount of matter in the universe (including baryons and dark matter), as measured from the cosmic microwave background spectrum, accounts for only about 30% of the critical density. This implies the existence of an additional form of energy to account for the remaining 70%. The Wilkinson Microwave Anisotropy Probe (WMAP) spacecraft seven-year analysis estimated a universe made up of 72.8% dark energy, 22.7% dark matter, and 4.5% ordinary matter. Work done in 2013 based on the Planck spacecraft observations of the cosmic microwave background gave a more accurate estimate of 68.3% dark energy, 26.8% dark matter, and 4.9% ordinary matter.

=== Late-time integrated Sachs–Wolfe effect ===
Accelerated cosmic expansion causes gravitational potential wells and hills to flatten as photons pass through them, producing cold spots and hot spots on the cosmic microwave background aligned with vast supervoids and superclusters. This so-called late-time Integrated Sachs–Wolfe effect (ISW) is a direct signal of dark energy in a flat universe. It was reported at high significance in 2008 by Ho et al. and Giannantonio et al.

=== Observational Hubble constant data ===
A new approach to test evidence of dark energy through observational Hubble constant data (OHD), also known as cosmic chronometers, has gained significant attention in recent years.

The Hubble constant, H(z), is measured as a function of cosmological redshift. OHD directly tracks the expansion history of the universe by taking passively evolving early-type galaxies as "cosmic chronometers". From this point, this approach provides standard clocks in the universe. The core of this idea is the measurement of the differential age evolution as a function of redshift of these cosmic chronometers. Thus, it provides a direct estimate of the Hubble parameter

$$H(z)=-\frac{1}{1+z} \frac{dz}{dt} \approx -\frac{1}{1+z} \frac{\Delta z}{\Delta t}.$$

The reliance on a differential quantity, Δz/Δt, brings more information and is appealing for computation: It can minimize many common issues and systematic effects. Analyses of supernovae and baryon acoustic oscillations (BAO) are based on integrals of the Hubble parameter, whereas Δz/Δt measures it directly. For these reasons, this method has been widely used to examine the accelerated cosmic expansion and study properties of dark energy.

== Theories of dark energy ==
Dark energy's status as a hypothetical force with unknown properties makes it an active target of research. The problem is attacked from a variety of angles, such as modifying the prevailing theory of gravity (general relativity), attempting to pin down the properties of dark energy, and finding alternative ways to explain the observational data.

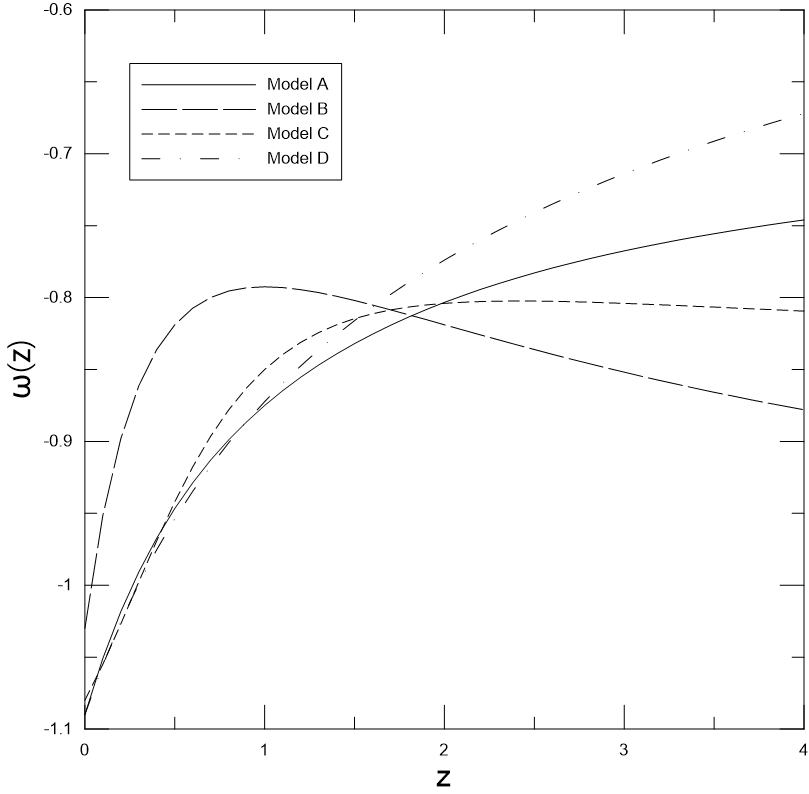
The equation of state of Dark Energy for 4 common models by Redshift. A: CPL Model, B: Jassal Model, C: Barboza & Alcaniz Model, D: Wetterich Model

=== Cosmological constant ===
Estimated distribution of matter and energy in the universe

The simplest explanation for dark energy is that it is an intrinsic, fundamental energy of space. This is the cosmological constant, usually represented by the Greek letter Λ (Lambda, hence the name Lambda-CDM model). Since energy and mass are related according to the equation E = mc^{2}, Einstein's theory of general relativity predicts that this energy will have a gravitational effect. It is sometimes called vacuum energy because it is the energy density of empty space – of vacuum.

A major outstanding problem is that the same quantum field theories predict a huge cosmological constant, about 120 orders of magnitude too large. This would need to be almost, but not exactly, cancelled by an equally large term of the opposite sign.

Some supersymmetric theories require a cosmological constant that is exactly zero. It is also unknown whether a positive cosmological constant is consistent with simple interpretations of string theory, in which our universe is a false vacuum with a positive cosmological constant. It has been conjectured by Ulf Danielsson et al. that no such state exists. However, even if string theory does not allow such a false vacuum, other models of dark energy, such as quintessence, could still be viable.

=== Quintessence ===
In quintessence models of dark energy, the observed acceleration of the scale factor is caused by the potential energy of a dynamical field, referred to as quintessence field. Quintessence differs from the cosmological constant in that it can vary in space and time. In order for it not to clump and form structure like matter, the field must be very light so that it has a large Compton wavelength. In the simplest scenarios, the quintessence field has a canonical kinetic term, is minimally coupled to gravity, and does not feature higher order operations in its Lagrangian.

No evidence of quintessence is yet available, nor has it been ruled out. It generally predicts a slightly slower acceleration of the expansion of the universe than the cosmological constant. Some scientists think that the best evidence for quintessence would come from violations of Einstein's equivalence principle and variation of the fundamental constants in space or time. Scalar fields are predicted by the Standard Model of particle physics and string theory, but an analogous problem to the cosmological constant problem (or the problem of constructing models of cosmological inflation) occurs: renormalization theory predicts that scalar fields should acquire large masses.

The coincidence problem asks why the acceleration of the Universe began when it did. If acceleration began earlier in the universe, structures such as galaxies would never have had time to form, and life, at least as we know it, would never have had a chance to exist. Proponents of the anthropic principle view this as support for their arguments. However, many models of quintessence have a so-called "tracker" behavior, which solves this problem. In these models, the quintessence field has a density which closely tracks (but is less than) the radiation density until matter–radiation equality, which triggers quintessence to start behaving as dark energy, eventually dominating the universe. This naturally sets the low energy scale of the dark energy.

In 2004, when scientists fit the evolution of dark energy with the cosmological data, they found that the equation of state $\omega$ had possibly crossed the cosmological constant boundary $\omega=-1$ from above to below. A no-go theorem has been proved that this scenario requires models with at least two types of scalar fields. This scenario is called Quintom, which was proposed by Xinmin Zhang's group in 2004.

Some special cases of quintessence are phantom dark energy, in which the energy density of quintessence actually increases with time, and k-essence (short for kinetic quintessence) which has a non-standard form of kinetic energy such as a negative kinetic energy. They can have unusual properties: phantom dark energy, for example, can cause a Big Rip.

A group of researchers argued in 2021 that observations of the Hubble tension may imply that only quintessence models with a nonzero coupling constant are viable.

=== Interacting dark energy ===
This class of theories attempts to come up with an all-encompassing theory of both dark matter and dark energy as a single phenomenon that modifies the laws of gravity at various scales. This could, for example, treat dark energy and dark matter as different facets of the same unknown substance, or postulate that cold dark matter decays into dark energy. Another class of theories that unifies dark matter and dark energy are suggested to be covariant theories of modified gravities. These theories alter the dynamics of spacetime such that the modified dynamics stems to what have been assigned to the presence of dark energy and dark matter. Dark energy could in principle interact not only with the rest of the dark sector, but also with ordinary matter. However, cosmology alone is not sufficient to effectively constrain the strength of the coupling between dark energy and baryons, so that other indirect techniques or laboratory searches have to be adopted. It was briefly theorized in the early 2020s that excess observed in the XENON1T detector in Italy may have been caused by a chameleon model of dark energy, but further experiments disproved this possibility.

=== Variable dark energy models ===
The density of dark energy might have varied in time during the history of the universe. Modern observational data allows us to estimate the present density of dark energy. Using baryon acoustic oscillations, it is possible to investigate the effect of dark energy in the history of the universe, and constrain parameters of the equation of state of dark energy. To that end, several models have been proposed. One of the most popular models is the Chevallier–Polarski–Linder model (CPL). Some other common models are Barboza & Alcaniz (2008), Jassal et al. (2005), Wetterich. (2004), and Oztas et al. (2018).

There is some observational evidence that dark energy is indeed decreasing with time. Data from the Dark Energy Spectroscopic Instrument (DESI), tracking the size of baryon acoustic oscillations over the universe's expansion history, suggests that the amount of dark energy is 10% lower than it was 4.5 billion years ago. However, there is not yet sufficient data to rule out dark energy being the cosmological constant.

== Alternatives to dark energy ==
=== Modified gravity ===
The evidence for dark energy is heavily dependent on the theory of general relativity. Therefore, it is conceivable that a modification to general relativity also eliminates the need for dark energy. There are many such theories, and research is ongoing. The measurement of the speed of gravity in the first gravitational wave measured by non-gravitational means (GW170817) ruled out many modified gravity theories as explanations to dark energy.

Astrophysicist Ethan Siegel states that, while such alternatives gain mainstream press coverage, almost all professional astrophysicists are confident that dark energy exists and that none of the competing theories successfully explain observations to the same level of precision as standard dark energy.

=== Observational skepticism ===
Some alternatives to dark energy, such as inhomogeneous cosmology, aim to explain the observational data by a more refined use of established theories. In this scenario, dark energy does not actually exist, and is merely a measurement artifact. For example, if we are located in an emptier-than-average region of space, the observed cosmic expansion rate could be mistaken for a variation in time, or acceleration. A different approach uses a cosmological extension of the equivalence principle to show how space might appear to be expanding more rapidly in the voids surrounding our local cluster. While weak, such effects considered cumulatively over billions of years could become significant, creating the illusion of cosmic acceleration, and making it appear as if we live in a Hubble bubble. Yet other possibilities are that the accelerated expansion of the universe is an illusion caused by the relative motion of us to the rest of the universe, or that the statistical methods employed were flawed. A laboratory direct detection attempt failed to detect any force associated with dark energy.

Observational skepticism explanations of dark energy have generally not gained much traction among cosmologists. For example, a paper that suggested the anisotropy of the local Universe has been misrepresented as dark energy was quickly countered by another paper claiming errors in the original paper. Another study questioning the essential assumption that the luminosity of Type Ia supernovae does not vary with stellar population age was also swiftly rebutted by other cosmologists.

=== As a general relativistic effect due to black holes ===
Another theory called "cosmological coupling" has been proposed as an explanation of dark energy effects. The idea is to require the local description of black holes, the Kerr metric, to match the description of the overall universe assumed in modern cosmology, Friedmann-Robertson-Walker metric, rather than spatially flat spacetime at infinity. Then one finds that black holes gain mass as the universe expands. The rate is measured to increase proportionally to a^{3} , where a is some scale factor for matter in the universe. This particular rate means that the energy density of black holes remains constant over time, mimicking dark energy. Other astrophysicists are skeptical, with a variety of papers claiming that the theory fails to explain other observations. Still other work suggests observations cannot rule out this model, but some theoretical work claims it can be ruled out.

=== Shockwave cosmology ===
Shockwave cosmology, proposed by Joel Smoller and Blake Temple in 2003, has the "big bang" as an explosion inside a black hole, producing the expanding volume of space and matter that includes the observable universe. A related theory by Smoller, Temple, and Vogler proposes that this shockwave may have resulted in our part of the universe having a lower density than that surrounding it, causing the accelerated expansion normally attributed to dark energy. They also propose that this related theory could be tested: a universe with dark energy should give a figure for the cubic correction to redshift versus luminosity C = −0.180 at a = a whereas for Smoller, Temple, and Vogler's alternative C should be positive rather than negative. They give a more precise calculation for their shockwave model alternative as: the cubic correction to redshift versus luminosity at a = a is C = 0.359.

Although shockwave cosmology produces a universe that "looks essentially identical to the aftermath of the big bang", cosmologists consider that it needs further development before it could be seen as a more advantageous model than the big bang theory (or standard model) in explaining the universe. In particular, and especially for the proposed alternative to dark energy, it would need to explain Big Bang nucleosynthesis, the quantitative details of the microwave background anisotropies, the Lyman-alpha forest, and galaxy surveys.

=== Mirror universe ===
In the mirror universe theory, dark energy could be conceptualized as the entanglement energy between the universe/anti-universe pair.

== Implications for the fate of the universe ==
Cosmologists estimate that the acceleration began roughly 5 billion years ago. (Note: Taken from Frieman, Turner, & Huterer (2008): The Universe has gone through three distinct eras: Radiation-dominated, z ≳ 3000; Matter-dominated, 3000 ≳ z ≳ 0.5; and Dark-energy-dominated, 0.5 ≳ z. The evolution of the scale factor is controlled by the dominant energy form: $$\; a(t) \propto t^{\frac{2}{3} (1 + w)^{-1}} ~$$ (for constant w ). During the radiation-dominated era, $$\; a(t) \propto t^{1/2} ~$$ during the matter-dominated era, $$\; a(t) \propto t^{2/3} ~$$ and for the dark energy-dominated era, assuming w ≃ −1 asymptotically $\; a(t) \propto e^{H\,t} ~.$ Taken together, all the current data provide strong evidence for the existence of dark energy; they constrain the fraction of critical density contributed by dark energy, 0.76 ± 0.02, and the equation-of-state parameter: w ≈ −1 ± 0.1 [stat.] ± 0.1 [sys.] , assuming that w is constant. This implies that the Universe began accelerating at redshift z ~ 0.4 and age t ~ 10 Ga. These results are robust – data from any one method can be removed without compromising the constraints – and they are not substantially weakened by dropping the assumption of spatial flatness.) Before that, it is thought that the expansion was decelerating, due to the attractive influence of matter. The density of dark matter in an expanding universe decreases more quickly than dark energy, and eventually the dark energy dominates. Specifically, when the volume of the universe doubles, the density of dark matter is halved, but the density of dark energy is nearly unchanged (it is exactly constant in the case of a cosmological constant).

Projections into the future can differ radically for different models of dark energy. For a cosmological constant, or any other model that predicts that the acceleration will continue indefinitely, the ultimate result will be that galaxies outside the Local Group will have a line-of-sight velocity that continually increases with time, eventually far exceeding the speed of light. This is not a violation of special relativity because the notion of "velocity" used here is different from that of velocity in a local inertial frame of reference, which is still constrained to be less than the speed of light for any massive object (see Uses of the proper distance for a discussion of the subtleties of defining any notion of relative velocity in cosmology). Because the Hubble parameter is decreasing with time, there can actually be cases where a galaxy that is receding from us faster than light does manage to emit a signal which reaches us eventually.

However, because of the accelerating expansion, it is projected that most galaxies will eventually cross a type of cosmological event horizon where any light they emit past that point will never be able to reach Earth at any time in the infinite future because the light never reaches a point where its "peculiar velocity" toward us exceeds the expansion velocity away from us (these two notions of velocity are also discussed in Uses of the proper distance). Assuming the dark energy is constant (a cosmological constant), the current distance to this cosmological event horizon is about 16 billion light years, meaning that a signal from an event happening at present would eventually be able to reach us in the future if the event were less than 16 billion light years away, but the signal would never reach us if the event were more than 16 billion light years away.

As galaxies approach the point of crossing this cosmological event horizon, the light from them will become more and more redshifted, to the point where the wavelength becomes too large to detect in practice and the galaxies appear to vanish completely (see Future of an expanding universe). Planet Earth, the Milky Way, and the Local Group of galaxies of which the Milky Way is a part, would all remain virtually undisturbed as the rest of the universe recedes and disappears from view. In this scenario, the Local Group would ultimately suffer heat death, just as was hypothesized for the flat, matter-dominated universe before measurements of cosmic acceleration.

There are other, more speculative ideas about the future of the universe. The phantom dark energy model of dark energy results in divergent expansion, which would imply that the effective force of dark energy continues growing until it dominates all other forces in the universe. Under this scenario, dark energy would ultimately tear apart all gravitationally bound structures, including galaxies and solar systems, and eventually overcome the electrical and nuclear forces to tear apart atoms themselves, ending the universe in a "Big Rip". On the other hand, dark energy might dissipate with time or even become attractive. Such uncertainties leave open the possibility of gravity eventually prevailing and lead to a universe that contracts in on itself in a "Big Crunch", or that there may even be a dark energy cycle, which implies a cyclic model of the universe in which every iteration (Big Bang then eventually a Big Crunch) takes about a trillion (10^{12}) years. While none of these are supported by observations, they are not ruled out.

== In philosophy of science ==
The astrophysicist David Merritt identifies dark energy as an example of an "auxiliary hypothesis", an ad hoc postulate that is added to a theory in response to observations that falsify it. He argues that the dark energy hypothesis is a conventionalist hypothesis, that is, a hypothesis that adds no empirical content and hence is unfalsifiable in the sense defined by Karl Popper. However, his opinion is not shared by all scientists.

== See also ==
- Conformal gravity
- Dark Energy Spectroscopic Instrument
- Dark matter
- De Sitter invariant special relativity
- Illustris project
- Inhomogeneous cosmology
- Joint Dark Energy Mission
- Negative mass
- Quintessence: The Search for Missing Mass in the Universe
- Dark Energy Survey
- Quantum vacuum state
