= Equation of state (cosmology) =

Equation of state in cosmology

In cosmology, the equation of state of a perfect fluid is characterized by a dimensionless number $w$, equal to the ratio of its pressure $p$ to its energy density $\varepsilon$:
$$w \equiv \frac{p}{\varepsilon}.$$
It is closely related to the thermodynamic equation of state and ideal gas law.

== The equation ==
The perfect gas equation of state may be written as
$$p = \rho RT = \rho c_s^2$$
where $\rho$ is the mass density, $R$ is the particular gas constant, $T$ is the temperature and $c_s=\sqrt{RT}$ is a characteristic thermal speed of the molecules. Thus
$$w \equiv \frac{p}{\rho c^2} =  \frac{\rho c_s^2}{\rho c^2} = \frac{c_s^2}{c^2}\approx 0$$
where $c$ is the speed of light, $\varepsilon = \rho c^2$ and $c_s\ll c$ for a "cold" gas.

=== FLRW equations and the equation of state ===
The equation of state may be used in Friedmann–Lemaître–Robertson–Walker (FLRW) equations to describe the evolution of an isotropic universe filled with a perfect fluid. If $a$ is the scale factor then
$$\varepsilon \propto a^{-3(1+w)}.$$
If the fluid is the dominant form of matter in a flat universe, then
$$a \propto t^{\frac{2}{3(1+w)}},$$
where $t$ is the proper time.

In general the Friedmann acceleration equation is
$$3 \frac{\ddot{a}}{a} = \Lambda - 4 \pi G \left(\varepsilon + 3p\right)$$
where $\Lambda$ is the cosmological constant and $G$ is Newton's constant, and $\ddot{a}$ is the second proper time derivative of the scale factor.

If we define (what might be called "effective") energy density and pressure as
$$\begin{align}
\varepsilon' &\equiv \varepsilon + \frac{\Lambda}{8 \pi G} \\[1ex]
p' &\equiv p - \frac{\Lambda}{8 \pi G}
\end{align}$$
and
$$p' = w'\varepsilon'$$
the acceleration equation may be written as
$$\frac{\ddot a}{a}=-\frac{4}{3}\pi G\left(\varepsilon' + 3p'\right) = -\frac{4}{3} \pi G \left(1+3w'\right)\varepsilon'$$

=== Non-relativistic particles ===
The equation of state for ordinary non-relativistic 'matter' (e.g. cold dust) is $w = 0$, which means that its energy density decreases as $\varepsilon \propto a^{-3} = V^{-1}$, where $V$ is a volume. In an expanding universe, the total energy of non-relativistic matter remains constant, with its density decreasing as the volume increases.

=== Radiation-dominated ultra-relativistic case ===
The equation of state for ultra-relativistic 'radiation' (including neutrinos, and in the very early universe other particles that later became non-relativistic) is $w = 1/3$ which means that its energy density decreases as $\varepsilon \propto a^{-4}$. In an expanding universe, the energy density of radiation decreases more quickly than the volume expansion, because its wavelength is red-shifted.

=== Stiff matter ===
Stiff matter is governed by the Zeldovich equation of state with $w = 1$ which means that its energy density decreases as $\varepsilon \propto a^{-6}$.

=== Acceleration of cosmic inflation ===
Cosmic inflation and the accelerated expansion of the universe can be characterized by the equation of state of dark energy. In the simplest case, the equation of state of the cosmological constant is $w = -1$. In this case, the above expression for the scale factor is not valid and $a\propto e^{Ht}$, where the constant H is the Hubble parameter. More generally, the expansion of the universe is accelerating for any equation of state $w < -1/3$. The accelerated expansion of the Universe was indeed observed. The observed value of equation of state of cosmological constant is near −1 from three different major studies.

Hypothetical phantom dark energy would have an equation of state $w < -1$, and would cause a Big Rip. Using the existing data, it is still impossible to distinguish between phantom $w < -1$ and non-phantom $w \ge -1$.

=== Fluids ===
In an expanding universe, fluids with larger equations of state disappear more quickly than those with smaller equations of state. This is the origin of the flatness and monopole problems of the Big Bang: curvature has $w = -1/3$ and monopoles have $w = 0$, so if they were around at the time of the early Big Bang, they should still be visible today. These problems are solved by cosmic inflation which has $w \approx -1$. Measuring the equation of state of dark energy is one of the largest efforts of observational cosmology. By accurately measuring $w$, it is hoped that the cosmological constant could be distinguished from quintessence which has $w \ne -1$.

=== Scalar modeling ===
A scalar field $\phi$ can be viewed as a sort of perfect fluid with equation of state
$$w = \frac{\frac{1}{2}\dot{\phi}^2-V(\phi)}{\frac{1}{2}\dot{\phi}^2+V(\phi)},$$
where $\dot{\phi}$ is the time-derivative of $\phi$ and $V(\phi)$ is the potential energy. A free ($V = 0$) scalar field has $w = 1$, and one with vanishing kinetic energy is equivalent to a cosmological constant: $w = -1$. Any equation of state in between, but not crossing the $w = -1$ barrier known as the Phantom Divide Line (PDL), is achievable, which makes scalar fields useful models for many phenomena in cosmology.

== Table ==
Different kinds of energy have different scaling properties.

Value	Energy density scaling	Time scaling	Phenomena described	Examples	Topological defect dimensions	Topological defect described
$w = 1$	$\varepsilon\propto a^{-6}$	$a \propto t^{\frac{1}{3}}$	Stiff matter, free scalar field	Higgs field, dilatons	-	-
$w = 1/3$	$\varepsilon \propto a^{-4}$	$a \propto t^{\frac{1}{2}}$	Ultra-relativistic particles	Photons, ultra-relativistic neutrinos, cosmic rays	-	-
$w = 0$	$\varepsilon \propto a^{-3}$	$a \propto t^{\frac{2}{3}}$	Non-relativistic particles	Cold baryonic matter, cold dark matter, cosmic neutrino background	0	Magnetic monopoles
$w = -1/3$	$\varepsilon \propto a^{-2}$	$a \propto t$	Curvature	Curvature of spacetime	1	Cosmic strings
$w = -2/3$	$\varepsilon \propto a^{-1}$	$a\propto t^{2}$	-	-	2	Domain walls
$w = -1$	$\varepsilon \propto a^{0}$	$a\propto e^{Ht}$	Cosmological constant	Dark energy	-	-
$w < -1$	-	-	Phantom dark energy	-	-	-
