= Cosmological constant =

Value representing energy density of space

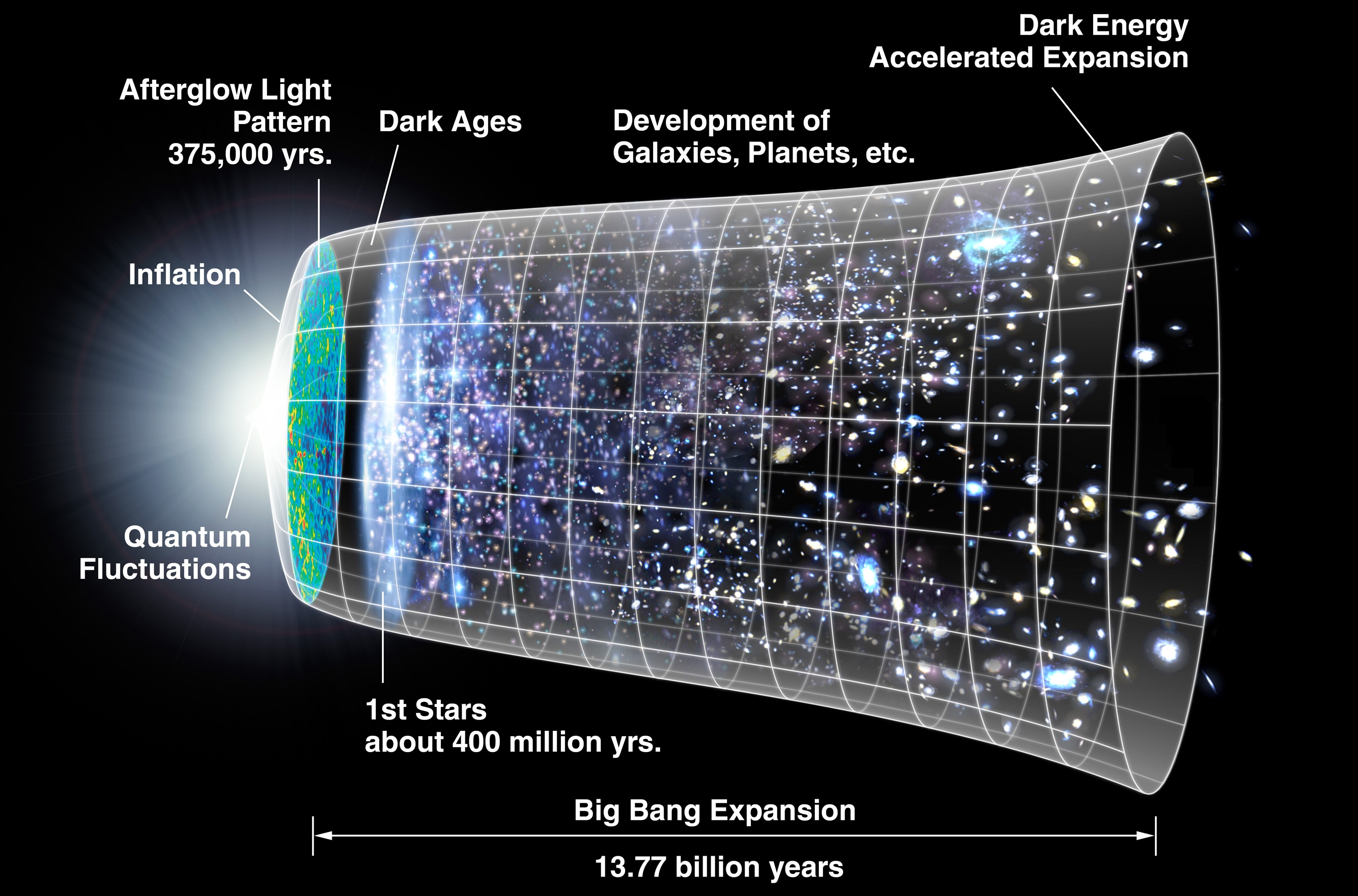
Sketch of the timeline of the Universe in the ΛCDM model. The accelerated expansion in the last third of the timeline represents the dark-energy dominated era.

In physical cosmology, the cosmological constant (usually denoted by the Greek capital letter lambda: Λ), alternatively called Einstein's cosmological constant, is a coefficient that Albert Einstein initially added to his field equations of general relativity. He later removed it; however, much later it was revived to express the energy density of space, or vacuum energy, that arises in quantum mechanics. It is closely associated with the concept of dark energy.

Einstein introduced the constant in 1917 to counterbalance the effect of gravity and achieve a static universe, which was then assumed. Einstein's cosmological constant was abandoned after Edwin Hubble confirmed that the universe was expanding. From the 1930s until the late 1990s, most physicists thought the cosmological constant to be zero. That changed with the discovery in 1998 that the expansion of the universe is accelerating, implying that the cosmological constant may have a positive value after all.

Since the 1990s, studies have shown that, assuming the cosmological principle, around 68% of the mass–energy density of the universe can be attributed to dark energy. The cosmological constant Λ is the simplest possible explanation for dark energy and is used in the standard model of cosmology known as the ΛCDM model.

According to quantum field theory, which underlies modern particle physics, empty space is defined by the vacuum state which is composed of a collection of quantum fields. All these quantum fields exhibit fluctuations in their ground state (lowest energy density) arising from the zero-point energy existing everywhere in space. These zero-point fluctuations should contribute to the cosmological constant Λ, but actual calculations give rise to an enormous vacuum energy. The discrepancy between theorized vacuum energy from quantum field theory and observed vacuum energy from cosmology is a source of major contention, with the values predicted exceeding observation by some 120 orders of magnitude, a discrepancy that has been called "the worst theoretical prediction in the history of physics!". This issue is called the cosmological constant problem, and it is one of the greatest mysteries in science with many physicists believing that "the vacuum holds the key to a full understanding of nature".

== History ==
In the Principia (1687), Isaac Newton identifies a central force proportional to distance as one of the "two principal cases of attraction" alongside the inverse-square law of gravity; in modern physics, this linear force law is mathematically equivalent to the force associated with a cosmological constant.

The cosmological constant was originally introduced in Albert Einstein's 1917 paper entitled Cosmological considerations in the General Theory of Relativity. Einstein included the cosmological constant as a term in his field equations for general relativity because he was dissatisfied that otherwise his equations did not allow for a static universe: gravity would cause a universe that was initially non-expanding to contract. To counteract this possibility, Einstein added the cosmological constant. However, he was not happy about adding this cosmological term. He later stated "Since I introduced this term, I had always a bad conscience. ... I am unable to believe that such an ugly thing is actually realized in nature". Einstein's static universe is unstable against matter density perturbations.

In 1929, not long after Einstein developed his static theory, observations by Edwin Hubble indicated that the universe appears to be expanding; this was consistent with a cosmological solution to the original general relativity equations that had been found by the mathematician Alexander Friedmann, working on the Einstein equations of general relativity. Einstein reportedly referred to his failure to accept the validation of his equations—when they had predicted the expansion of the universe in theory, before it was demonstrated in observation of the cosmological redshift—as his "biggest blunder" (according to George Gamow).

It transpired that adding the cosmological constant to Einstein's equations does not lead to a static universe at equilibrium because the equilibrium is unstable: if the universe expands slightly, then the expansion releases vacuum energy, which causes yet more expansion. Likewise, a universe that contracts slightly will continue contracting.

However, the cosmological constant remained a subject of theoretical and empirical interest. Empirically, the cosmological data of recent decades strongly suggest that our universe has a positive cosmological constant. The explanation of this small but positive value is a remaining theoretical challenge, the so-called cosmological constant problem.

Some early generalizations of Einstein's gravitational theory, known as classical unified field theories, either introduced a cosmological constant on theoretical grounds or found that it arose naturally from the mathematics. For example, Arthur Eddington claimed that the cosmological constant version of the vacuum field equation expressed the "epistemological" property that the universe is "self-gauging", and Erwin Schrödinger's pure-affine theory using a simple variational principle produced the field equation with a cosmological term.

In 1990s, Saul Perlmutter at Lawrence Berkeley National Laboratory, Brian Schmidt of the Australian National University and Adam Riess of the Space Telescope Science Institute were searching for type Ia supernovae. At that time, they expected to observe the deceleration of the supernovae caused by gravitational attraction of mass according to Einstein's gravitational theory. The first reports published in July 1997 from the Supernova Cosmology Project used the supernova observation to support such deceleration hypothesis. But soon they found that supernovae were accelerating away. Both teams announced this surprising result in 1998. It implied the universe is undergoing accelerating expansion. The cosmological constant is needed to explain such acceleration. Following this discovery, the cosmological constant was reinserted in the general relativity equations.

=== Sequence of events 1915–1998 ===
- In 1915, Einstein publishes his equations of general relativity, without a cosmological constant Λ.
- In 1917, Einstein adds the parameter Λ to his equations when he realizes that his theory implies a dynamic universe for which space is a function of time. He then gives this constant a value that makes his Universe model remain static and eternal (Einstein static universe).
- In 1922, the Russian physicist Alexander Friedmann mathematically shows that Einstein's equations (whatever Λ) remain valid in a dynamic universe.
- In 1927, the Belgian astrophysicist Georges Lemaître shows that the Universe is expanding by combining general relativity with astronomical observations, those of Hubble in particular.
- In 1931, Einstein accepts the theory of an expanding universe and proposes, in 1931, a model of a continuously expanding universe with zero cosmological constant (the Friedmann–Einstein universe). This is followed by another model, in 1932, with the Dutch physicist and astronomer Willem de Sitter in which both the cosmological constant and spatial curvature are set to zero (the Einstein–de Sitter universe).
- In 1998, two teams of astrophysicists, the Supernova Cosmology Project and the High-Z Supernova Search Team, carried out measurements on distant supernovae which showed that the speed of galaxies' recession in relation to the Milky Way increases over time. The universe is in accelerated expansion, which requires having a strictly positive Λ. The universe would contain a mysterious dark energy producing a repulsive force that counterbalances the gravitational braking produced by the matter contained in the universe (see Standard cosmological model).
  For this work, Perlmutter, Schmidt, and Riess jointly received the Nobel Prize in Physics in 2011.

== Equation ==
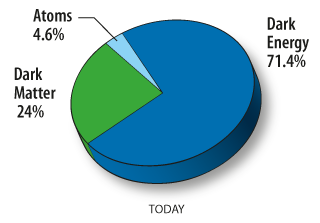
Estimated ratios of dark matter and dark energy (which may be the cosmological constant) in the universe. This image is made by NASA using the 9 year WMAP data. This is the final WMAP release.

The cosmological constant Λ appears in the Einstein field equations in the form
$$R_{\mu \nu} - \tfrac{1}{2} R\, g_{\mu \nu} + \Lambda g_{\mu \nu} = \kappa T_{\mu \nu} ,$$
where the Ricci tensor R_{μν}, Ricci scalar R and the metric tensor g_{μν} describe the structure of spacetime, the stress–energy tensor T_{μν} describes the energy density, momentum density and stress at that point in spacetime, and κ = 8πG/c^{4}. The gravitational constant G and the speed of light c are universal constants. When Λ is zero, this reduces to the field equation of general relativity usually used in the 20th century. When T_{μν} is zero, the field equation describes empty space (a vacuum).

The cosmological constant has the same effect as an intrinsic energy density of the vacuum, ρ_{vac} (and an associated pressure). In this context, it is commonly moved to the right-hand side of the equation using Λ = κρ_{vac}. It is common to quote values of energy density directly, though still using the name "cosmological constant". The dimension of Λ is generally understood as length^{−2}.

Using the Planck units, and the value evaluated in 2025 for the Hubble constant H_{0} = 76.5±2.2 (km/s)/Mpc = (2.48±0.07)×10^{−18} s^{−1}, Λ has the value of
$$\begin{align}
\Lambda = 3\, \left( \frac{\,H_0\,}{c} \right)^2 \Omega_\Lambda &= 1.4657 \times 10^{-52}\ \text{m}^{-2} \\
&= 3.827 \times 10^{-123} \,l_{\text{P}}^{-2}
\end{align}$$
where $l_{\text{P}}$ is the Planck length. A positive vacuum energy density resulting from a cosmological constant implies a negative pressure, and vice versa. If the energy density is positive, the associated negative pressure will drive an accelerated expansion of the universe, as observed. (See Dark energy and Cosmic inflation for details.)

=== Density parameter Ω ===
The dimensionless density parameter Ω represents the ratio of the actual density of a component of the universe to the critical density. The total density parameter for a flat universe (concluded by WMAP), can be expressed as:

$$\Omega_\text{total} = \Omega_m + \Omega_{\Lambda} + \Omega_k = 1$$

Where:

- Ω_{m} is the matter density parameter (including both baryonic and dark matter);
- Ω_{Λ} is the density parameter for dark energy (cosmological constant); and
- Ω_{k} describes the curvature of the universe which is 0 in a flat universe.

Instead of the cosmological constant itself, cosmologists often refer to the ratio between the energy density due to the cosmological constant and the critical density of the universe, the tipping point for a sufficient density to stop the universe from expanding forever (the dark energy density parameter). This ratio is estimated to be 0.714, according to results published by the Planck Collaboration in 2018 and clearly mentioned on WMAP. More intuitively, this parameter could be described as the fraction of the universe that is made up of dark energy. Note that this value changes over time: The critical density changes with cosmological time but the energy density due to the cosmological constant remains unchanged throughout the history of the universe, because the amount of dark energy increases as the universe grows but the amount of matter does not.

=== Equation of state ===
Another ratio that is used by scientists is the equation of state, usually denoted w, which is the ratio of pressure that dark energy puts on the universe to the energy per unit volume. This ratio is w = −1 for the cosmological constant used in the Einstein equations; alternative time-varying forms of vacuum energy such as quintessence generally use a different value. The value w = −1.028±0.032, measured by the Planck Collaboration (2018) is consistent with −1, assuming w does not change over cosmic time.

== Value ==
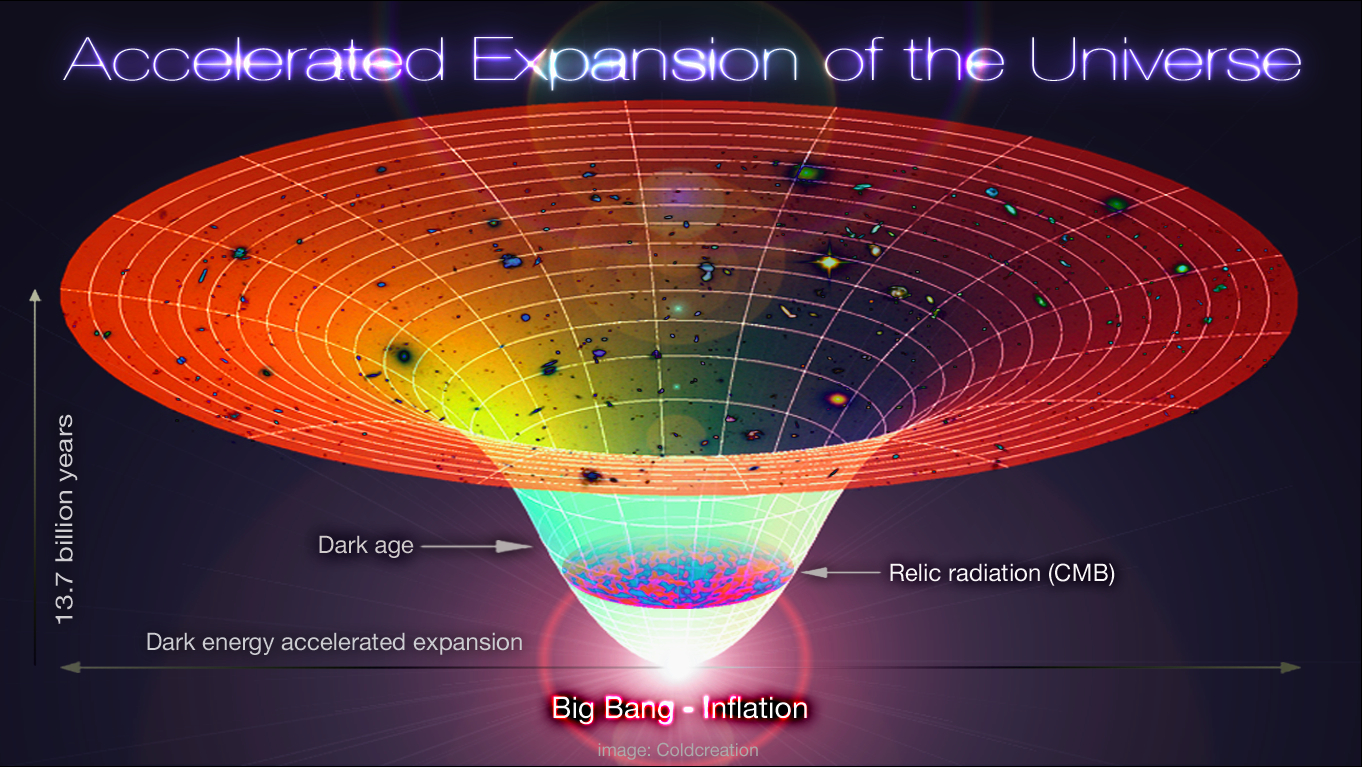
Lambda-CDM, accelerated expansion of the universe. The time-line in this schematic diagram extends from the Big Bang/inflation era 13.7 Byr ago to the present cosmological time.

Observations announced in 1998 of distance–redshift relation for Type Ia supernovae indicated that the expansion of the universe is accelerating, if one assumes the cosmological principle. When combined with measurements of the cosmic microwave background radiation these implied a value of Ω_{Λ} ≈ 0.7, a result which has been supported and refined by more recent measurements (as well as previous works). If one assumes the cosmological principle, as in the case for all models that use the Friedmann–Lemaître–Robertson–Walker metric, while there are other possible causes of an accelerating universe, such as quintessence, the cosmological constant is in most respects the simplest solution. Thus, the Lambda-CDM model, the current standard model of cosmology which uses the FLRW metric, includes the cosmological constant, which is measured to be on the order of 10^{−52} m^{−2}. It may be expressed as 10^{−35} s^{−2} (multiplying by c^{2} ≈ 10^{17} m^{2}⋅s^{−2}) or as 10^{−122} ℓ_{P}^{−2} (where ℓ_{P} is the Planck length). The value is based on recent measurements of vacuum energy density, ρ_{vac} = 5.96×10^{−27} kg/m^{3} ≘ 5.3566×10^{−10} J/m^{3} = 3.35 GeV/m^{3}. However, due to the Hubble tension and the CMB dipole, recently it has been proposed that the cosmological principle is no longer true in the late universe and that the FLRW metric breaks down, so it is possible that observations usually attributed to an accelerating universe are simply a result of the cosmological principle not applying in the late universe.

As was seen, by works of 't Hooft, Susskind and others, a positive cosmological constant has surprising consequences, such as a finite maximum entropy of the observable universe (see Holographic principle).

== Predictions ==
=== Quantum field theory ===
Unsolved problem in physics
Why does the zero-point energy of the quantum vacuum not cause a large cosmological constant? What cancels it out?
More unsolved problems in physics

A major outstanding problem is that most quantum field theories predict a huge value for the quantum vacuum. A common assumption is that the quantum vacuum is equivalent to the cosmological constant. Although no theory exists that supports this assumption, arguments can be made in its favor.

Such arguments are usually based on dimensional analysis and effective field theory. If the universe is described by an effective local quantum field theory down to the Planck scale, then we would expect a cosmological constant of the order of $M_{\rm pl}^2$ ($1$ in reduced Planck units). As noted above, the measured cosmological constant is smaller than this by a factor of ~10^{120}. This discrepancy has been called "the worst theoretical prediction in the history of physics".

Some supersymmetric theories require a cosmological constant that is exactly zero, which further complicates things. This is the cosmological constant problem, the worst problem of fine-tuning in physics: there is no known natural way to derive the tiny cosmological constant used in cosmology from particle physics.

No vacuum in the string theory landscape is known to support a metastable, positive cosmological constant, and in 2018 a group of four physicists advanced a controversial conjecture which would imply that no such universe exists.

=== Anthropic principle ===
One possible explanation for the small but non-zero value was noted by Steven Weinberg in 1987 following the anthropic principle. Weinberg explains that if the vacuum energy took different values in different domains of the universe, then observers would necessarily measure values similar to that which is observed: the formation of life-supporting structures would be suppressed in domains where the vacuum energy is much larger. Specifically, if the vacuum energy is negative and its absolute value is substantially larger than it appears to be in the observed universe (say, a factor of 10 larger), holding all other variables (e.g. matter density) constant, that would mean that the universe is closed; furthermore, its lifetime would be shorter than the age of our universe, possibly too short for intelligent life to form. On the other hand, a universe with a large positive cosmological constant would expand too fast, preventing galaxy formation. According to Weinberg, domains where the vacuum energy is compatible with life would be comparatively rare. Using this argument, Weinberg predicted that the cosmological constant would have a value of less than a hundred times the currently accepted value. In 1992, Weinberg refined this prediction of the cosmological constant to 5 to 10 times the matter density.

This argument depends on the vacuum energy density being constant throughout spacetime, as would be expected if dark energy were the cosmological constant. There is no evidence that the vacuum energy does vary, but it may be the case if, for example, the vacuum energy is (even in part) the potential of a scalar field such as the residual inflaton (also see Quintessence). Another theoretical approach that deals with the issue is that of multiverse theories, which predict a large number of "parallel" universes with different laws of physics and/or values of fundamental constants. Again, the anthropic principle states that we can only live in one of the universes that is compatible with some form of intelligent life. Critics claim that these theories, when used as an explanation for fine-tuning, commit the inverse gambler's fallacy.

In 1995, Weinberg's argument was refined by Alexander Vilenkin to predict a value for the cosmological constant that was only ten times the matter density, i.e. about three times the current value since determined.

=== Failure to detect dark energy ===
An attempt to directly observe and relate quanta or fields like the chameleon particle or the symmetron theory to dark energy, in a laboratory setting, failed to detect a new force. Inferring the presence of dark energy through its interaction with baryons in the cosmic microwave background has also led to a negative result, although the current analyses have been derived only at the linear perturbation regime. It is also possible that the difficulty in detecting dark energy is due to the fact that the cosmological constant describes an existing, known interaction (e.g. electromagnetic field).

== See also ==
- Big Rip
- Higgs mechanism
- Lambdavacuum solution
- Hierarchy problem
- Quantum electrodynamics
- de Sitter invariant special relativity
- Unruh effect
