= Timeline of the far future =

Scientific projections regarding the far future

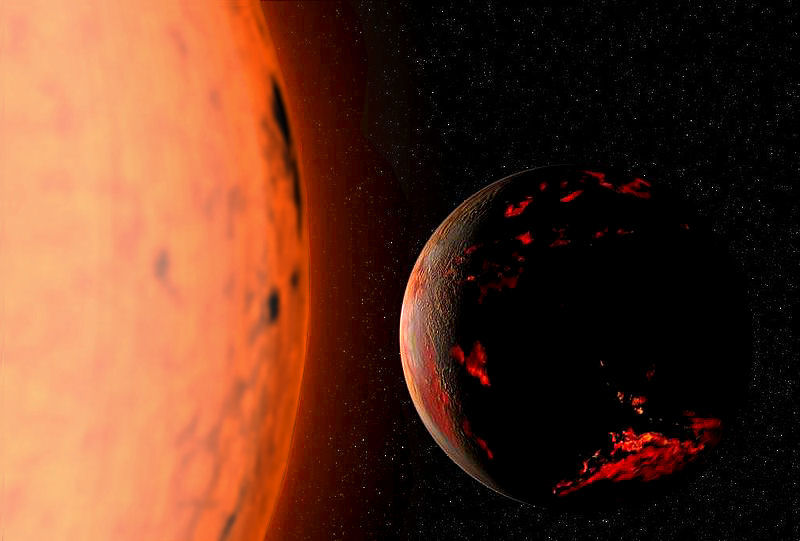
Artist's concept of the Earth 5–7.5 billion years from now, when the Sun has become a red giant

While, due to indeterminacy and possibly free will, the future cannot be predicted with certainty, present understanding in various scientific fields allows for the prediction of some far-future events, if only in the broadest outline. These fields include astrophysics, which studies how planets and stars form, interact and die; particle physics, which has revealed how matter behaves at the smallest scales; evolutionary biology, which studies how life evolves over time; plate tectonics, which shows how continents shift over millennia; and sociology, which examines how human societies and cultures evolve.

These timelines begin at the start of the 4th millennium in 3001 CE, and continue until the furthest and most remote reaches of future time. They include alternative future events that address unresolved scientific questions, such as whether humans will become extinct, whether the Earth survives when the Sun expands to become a red giant and whether proton decay will be the eventual end of all matter in the universe.

== Earth, the Solar System, and the universe ==
All projections of the future of Earth, the Solar System and the universe must account for the second law of thermodynamics, which states that entropy, or a loss of the energy available to do work, must rise over time. Stars will eventually exhaust their supply of hydrogen fuel via fusion and burn out. The Sun will likely expand sufficiently to overwhelm most of the inner planets (Mercury, Venus, and possibly Earth) but not the giant planets, including Jupiter and Saturn. Afterwards, the Sun will be reduced to the size of a white dwarf, and the outer planets and their moons will continue to orbit this diminutive solar remnant. This future situation may be similar to the white dwarf star MOA-2010-BLG-477L and the Jupiter-sized exoplanet orbiting it.

Long after the death of the Solar System, physicists expect that matter itself will eventually disintegrate under the influence of radioactive decay, as even the most stable materials break apart into subatomic particles. Current data suggest that the universe has a flat geometry (or very close to flat) and will therefore not collapse in on itself after a finite time. This infinite future could allow for the occurrence of massively improbable events, such as the formation of Boltzmann brains or spontaneous inflation triggering a new Big Bang.

Keys
Astronomy and astrophysics	Astronomy and astrophysics
Geology and planetary science	Geology and planetary science
Biology	Biology
Particle physics	Particle physics
Technology and culture	Technology and culture

	Date (CE) or years from now	Event
Astronomy and astrophysics	c. 4200 CE	As Earth's poles precess, Gamma Cephei replaces Polaris as the northern pole star.
Geology and planetary science	1,000 – 10,000	As one of the long-term effects of global warming, the Greenland ice sheet will have completely melted. The melt rate will depend on the amount of carbon emissions in the air.
Geology and planetary science	10,000	If a failure of the Wilkes Subglacial Basin "ice plug" in the next few centuries were to endanger the East Antarctic Ice Sheet, it would take up to this long to melt completely. Sea levels would rise 3 to 4 metres. One of the potential long-term effects of global warming, this is separate from the shorter-term threat to the West Antarctic Ice Sheet.
Geology and planetary science	10,000	Excepting for human activity, Earth would be midway through a stable warm period with the next glacial period of the Quaternary glaciation due in 10,000 years. Taking human activities into account, the greenhouse gas emissions may disrupt this natural cycle. Carbon dioxide released from burning fossil fuels could cause the planet to skip glacial periods repeatedly for at least the next 500,000 years.
Astronomy and astrophysics	10,000 – 1 million (Note: This represents the time by which the event will most probably have happened. It may occur randomly at any time from the present.)	The red supergiant stars Betelgeuse and Antares will likely have exploded as supernovae. For a few months, the explosions should be easily visible on Earth in daylight.
Astronomy and astrophysics	c. 14,000 CE	As Earth's poles precess, Vega, the fifth-brightest star in the sky, becomes the northern pole star. Although Earth cycles through many different naked-eye northern pole stars, Vega is the brightest.
Astronomy and astrophysics	11,000–15,000	By this point, halfway through Earth's precessional cycle, Earth's axial tilt will be mirrored, causing summer and winter to occur on opposite sides of Earth's orbit. This means that the seasons in the Southern Hemisphere will be less extreme than they are today, as it will face away from the Sun at Earth's perihelion and towards the Sun at aphelion; the seasons in the Northern Hemisphere will be more extreme, as it experiences more pronounced seasonal variation because of a higher percentage of land.
Geology and planetary science	15,000	The oscillating tilt of Earth's poles will have moved the North African Monsoon far enough north to change the climate of the Sahara back into a tropical one such as it had 5,000–10,000 years ago.
Geology and planetary science	17,000	The best-guess recurrence rate for a "civilization-threatening" supervolcanic eruption large enough to eject one teratonne (one trillion tonnes) of pyroclastic material.
Geology and planetary science	25,000	The northern polar ice cap of Mars could recede as the planet reaches a warming peak of its northern hemisphere during the c. 50,000-year perihelion precession aspect of its Milankovitch cycle.
Astronomy and astrophysics	36,000	The small red dwarf Ross 248 will pass within 3.024 light-years of Earth, becoming the closest star to the Sun. It will recede after about 8,000 years, making first Alpha Centauri (again) and then Gliese 445 the nearest stars (see timeline).
Geology and planetary science	50,000	According to Berger and Loutre, the current interglacial period will end, sending the Earth back into a glacial period of the Quaternary glaciation, regardless of the effects of anthropogenic global warming. However, according to more recent studies in 2016, anthropogenic climate change, if left unchecked, may delay this otherwise expected glacial period by as much as an additional 50,000 years, potentially skipping it entirely. Niagara Falls will have eroded the remaining 32 km to Lake Erie and will therefore cease to exist. The many glacial lakes of the Canadian Shield will have been erased by post-glacial rebound and erosion.
Astronomy and astrophysics	50,000	Due to lunar tides decelerating the Earth's rotation, a day on Earth is expected to be one SI second longer than it is today. To compensate, either a leap second will have to be added to the end of every day, or the length of the day will have to be officially lengthened by one SI second.
Geology and planetary science	60,000	It is possible that the current cooling trend might be interrupted by an interstadial phase (a warmer period), with the next glacial maximum of the Quaternary glaciation reached only in about 100 kyr AP.
Astronomy and astrophysics	100,000	The proper motion of stars across the celestial sphere, which results from their movement through the Milky Way, renders many of the constellations unrecognizable.
Astronomy and astrophysics	100,000	The red hypergiant star VY Canis Majoris will likely have exploded in a supernova.
Biology	100,000	Native North American earthworms, such as Megascolecidae, will have naturally spread north through the United States Upper Midwest to the Canada–United States border, recovering from the Laurentide ice sheet glaciation (38°N to 49°N), assuming a migration rate of 10 metres per year, and that a possible renewed glaciation by this time has not prevented this. (However, humans have already introduced non-native invasive earthworms of North America on a much shorter timescale, causing a shock to the regional ecosystem.)
Astronomy and astrophysics	100,000 – 10 million	Cupid and Belinda, moons of Uranus, will likely have collided.
Geology and planetary science	100,000	Earth will likely have undergone a supervolcanic eruption large enough to erupt 400 km^{3} (96 cubic miles) of magma.
Geology and planetary science	100,000	According to Berger and Loutre, the next glacial maximum of the Quaternary glaciation is expected to be the most intense, regardless of the effects of anthropogenic global warming.
Geology and planetary science	> 100,000	As one of the long-term effects of global warming, ten percent of anthropogenic carbon dioxide will still remain in a stabilized atmosphere.
Geology and planetary science	250,000	Kamaʻehuakanaloa (formerly Lōʻihi), the youngest volcano in the Hawaiian–Emperor seamount chain, will rise above the surface of the ocean and become a new volcanic island.
Astronomy and astrophysics	c. 300,000	At some point in the next few hundred thousand years, the Wolf–Rayet star WR 104 may explode in a supernova. There is a small chance that WR 104 is spinning fast enough to produce a gamma-ray burst (GRB), and an even smaller chance that such a GRB could pose a threat to life on Earth.
Astronomy and astrophysics	500,000	Earth will likely have been hit by an asteroid of roughly 1 km in diameter, assuming that it is not averted.
Geology and planetary science	500,000	The rugged terrain of Badlands National Park in South Dakota will have eroded completely.
Geology and planetary science	600,000	The estimated time until a future super-eruption of the Toba supervolcano. The most recent super-eruption occurred 75,000 years ago, triggering 6–10 years of global volcanic winter and dramatically cooling Earth for over 1,000 years.
Geology and planetary science	1 million	Meteor Crater, a large impact crater in Arizona considered the "freshest" of its kind, will have worn away.
Astronomy and astrophysics	1 million	Desdemona and Cressida, moons of Uranus, will likely have collided. The stellar system Eta Carinae will likely have exploded in a supernova.
Geology and planetary science	1 million	Earth will likely have undergone a supervolcanic eruption large enough to erupt 3,200 km^{3} (770 cubic miles) of magma, an event comparable to the Toba supereruption 75,000 years ago.
Astronomy and astrophysics	1.29 ± 0.04 million	The star Gliese 710 will pass as close as 0.051 parsecs (0.1663 light-years; 10,520 astronomical units) to the Sun before moving away. This will gravitationally perturb members of the Oort cloud, a halo of icy bodies orbiting at the edge of the Solar System, thereafter raising the likelihood of a cometary impact in the inner Solar System.
Biology	2 million	The estimated time for the full recovery of coral reef ecosystems from human-caused ocean acidification if such acidification goes unchecked; the recovery of marine ecosystems after the acidification event that occurred about 65 million years ago took a similar length of time.
Geology and planetary science	2 million+	The Grand Canyon will erode further, deepening slightly, but principally widening into a broad valley surrounding the Colorado River.
Astronomy and astrophysics	2.7 million	The average orbital half-life of current centaurs, which are unstable because of gravitational interactions with the several outer planets. See predictions for notable centaurs.
Astronomy and astrophysics	3 million	Due to tidal deceleration gradually slowing Earth's rotation, a day on Earth is expected to be one minute longer than it is today. To compensate, either a "leap minute" will have to be added to the end of every day, or the length of the day will have to be officially lengthened by one SI minute.
Astronomy and astrophysics	6 million	Estimated time for comet C/1999 F1 (Catalina), one of the longest-period comets known to return to the inner Solar System, after having travelled in its orbit out to its aphelion 66,600 AU (1.053 light-years) from the Sun and back.
Geology and planetary science	10 million	The Red Sea will flood the widening East African Rift valley, causing a new ocean basin to divide the continent of Africa and the African plate into the newly formed Nubian plate and the Somali plate. The Indian plate will advance into Tibet by 180 km (110 mi). Nepali territory, whose boundaries are defined by the Himalayan peaks and the plains of India, will cease to exist.
Biology	10 million	The estimated time for the full recovery of biodiversity after a potential Holocene extinction, if it were on the scale of the five previous major extinction events. Even without a mass extinction, by this time most current species will have disappeared through the background extinction rate, with many clades gradually evolving into new forms.
Astronomy and astrophysics	15 million	An estimated 694 stars will have approached the Solar System to less than 5 parsecs. Of these, 26 have a good probability to come within 1.0 parsec (3.3 light-years) and 7 within 0.5 parsecs (1.6 light-years).
Geology and planetary science	20 million	The Strait of Gibraltar will have closed due to subduction and a Ring of Fire will form in the Atlantic, similar to that in the Pacific.
Astronomy and astrophysics	30 million	Earth will likely have been hit by an asteroid of roughly 5 km in diameter, assuming that it is not averted.
Astronomy and astrophysics	50 million	The maximum estimated time before the moon Phobos collides with Mars.
Geology and planetary science	50 million	According to Christopher Scotese, the movement of the San Andreas Fault will cause the Gulf of California to flood into the California Central Valley. This will form a new inland sea on the West Coast of North America, causing the current locations of Los Angeles and San Francisco in California to merge. The Californian coast will begin to be subducted into the Aleutian Trench. Africa's collision with Eurasia will close the Mediterranean basin and create a mountain range similar to the Himalayas. The Appalachian Mountains peaks will have largely worn away, weathering at 5.7 Bubnoff units, although topography will actually rise as regional valleys deepen at twice this rate.
Geology and planetary science	50–60 million	The Canadian Rockies will have worn away to a plain, assuming a rate of 60 Bubnoff units. The Southern Rockies in the United States are eroding at a somewhat slower rate.
Geology and planetary science	50–400 million	The estimated time for Earth to naturally replenish its fossil fuel reserves.
Geology and planetary science	80 million	The Big Island will have become the last of the current Hawaiian Islands to sink beneath the surface of the ocean, while a more recently formed chain of "new Hawaiian Islands" will then have emerged in their place.
Astronomy and astrophysics	100 million	Earth will likely have been hit by an asteroid comparable in size to the one that triggered the K–Pg extinction 66 million years ago, assuming this is not averted.
Geology and planetary science	100 million	Upper estimate for the lifespan of Saturn's rings in their current state.
Astronomy and astrophysics	110 million	The Sun's luminosity will have increased by one percent.
Geology and planetary science	125 million	According to the Pangaea Proxima model created by Christopher R. Scotese, the Atlantic Ocean is predicted to stop widening and begin to shrink as the Mid-Atlantic Ridge seafloor spreading gives way to subduction. In this scenario, the mid-ocean ridge between South America and Africa will probably be subducted first; the Atlantic Ocean is predicted to narrow as a result of subduction beneath the Americas. The Indian Ocean is also predicted to be smaller due to northward subduction of oceanic crust into the Central Indian trench. Antarctica is expected to split in two and shift northwards, colliding with Madagascar and Australia, enclosing a remnant of the Indian Ocean, which Scotese calls the "Medi-Pangaean Sea".
Astronomy and astrophysics	180 million	Due to the gradual slowing of Earth's rotation, a day on Earth will be one hour longer than it is today. To compensate, either a "leap hour" will have to be added to the end of every day, or the length of the day will have to be officially lengthened by one SI hour.
Astronomy and astrophysics	230 million	Prediction of the orbits of the Solar System's planets is impossible over timespans greater than this, due to the limitations of Lyapunov time.
Astronomy and astrophysics	240 million	From its present position, the Solar System completes one full orbit of the Galactic Center.
Geology and planetary science	250 million	According to Christopher R. Scotese, due to the northward movement of the West Coast of North America, the coast of California will collide with Alaska.
Geology and planetary science	250–350 million	All the continents on Earth may fuse into a supercontinent. Four potential arrangements of this configuration have been dubbed Amasia, Novopangaea, Pangaea Proxima and Aurica. This will likely result in a glacial period, lowering sea levels and increasing oxygen levels, further lowering global temperatures.
Biology	> 250 million	The supercontinent's formation, thanks to a combination of continentality increasing distance from the ocean, an increase in volcanic activity resulting in atmospheric CO_{2} at double current levels, increased interspecific competition, and a 2.5 percent increase in solar flux, is likely to trigger an extinction event comparable to the Great Dying 250 million years ago. Mammals in particular are unlikely to survive, assuming they still exist in their current forms by this point.
Geology and planetary science	300 million	Due to a shift in the equatorial Hadley cells to roughly 40° north and south, the amount of arid land will increase by 25%.
Geology and planetary science	300–600 million	The estimated time for Venus's mantle temperature to reach its maximum. Then, over a period of about 100 million years, major subduction occurs and the crust is recycled.
Geology and planetary science	350 million	According to the extroversion model first developed by Paul F. Hoffman, subduction ceases in the Pacific Ocean basin.
Geology and planetary science	400–500 million	The supercontinent (Pangaea Proxima, Novopangaea, Amasia, or Aurica) will likely have rifted apart. This will likely result in higher global temperatures, similar to the Cretaceous period.
Astronomy and astrophysics	500 million	The estimated time until a gamma-ray burst, or massive, hyperenergetic supernova, occurs within 6,500 light-years of Earth; close enough for its rays to affect Earth's ozone layer and potentially trigger a mass extinction, assuming the hypothesis is correct that a previous such explosion triggered the Ordovician–Silurian extinction event. However, the supernova would have to be precisely oriented relative to Earth to have such effect.
Astronomy and astrophysics	600 million	Tidal acceleration moves the Moon far enough from Earth that total solar eclipses are no longer possible.
Geology and planetary science	500–600 million	The Sun's increasing luminosity begins to disrupt the carbonate–silicate cycle; higher luminosity increases weathering of surface rocks, which traps carbon dioxide in the ground as carbonate. As water evaporates from the Earth's surface, rocks harden, causing plate tectonics to slow and eventually stop once the oceans evaporate completely. With less volcanism to recycle carbon into the Earth's atmosphere, carbon dioxide levels begin to fall. By this time, carbon dioxide levels will fall to the point at which C_{3} photosynthesis is no longer possible. All plants that use C_{3} photosynthesis (roughly 99 percent of present-day species) will die. The extinction of C_{3} plant life is likely to be a long-term decline rather than a sharp drop. It is likely that plant groups will die one by one well before the critical carbon dioxide level is reached. The first plants to disappear will be C_{3} herbaceous plants, followed by deciduous forests, evergreen broad-leaf forests, and finally evergreen conifers. However, a 2024 paper by RJ Graham et al. argues that silicate weathering is far less temperature-dependent than initially thought, and that falling carbon dioxide levels are unlikely to lead to the death of life on Earth.
Biology	500–800 million	As Earth begins to warm and carbon dioxide levels fall, plants—and, by extension, animals—could survive longer by evolving other strategies such as requiring less carbon dioxide for photosynthetic processes, becoming carnivorous, adapting to desiccation, or associating with fungi. These adaptations are likely to appear near the beginning of the moist greenhouse. The decrease in plant life will result in less oxygen in the atmosphere, allowing for more DNA-damaging ultraviolet radiation to reach the surface. The rising temperatures will increase chemical reactions in the atmosphere, further lowering oxygen levels. Plant and animal communities become increasingly sparse and isolated as the Earth becomes more barren. Flying animals would be better off because of their ability to travel large distances looking for cooler temperatures. Many animals may be driven to the poles or possibly underground. These creatures would become active during the polar night and aestivate during the polar day due to the intense heat and radiation. Much of the land would become a barren desert, and plants and animals would primarily be found in the oceans.
Geology and planetary science	500–800 million	As pointed out by Peter Ward and Donald Brownlee in their book The Life and Death of Planet Earth, according to NASA Ames scientist Kevin Zahnle, this is the earliest time for plate tectonics to eventually stop, due to the gradual cooling of the Earth's core, which could potentially turn the Earth back into a water world. This would, in turn, likely cause the extinction of Earth's remaining land life.
Biology	800–900 million	Carbon dioxide levels will fall to the point at which C_{4} photosynthesis is no longer possible. Without plant life to recycle oxygen in the atmosphere, free oxygen and the ozone layer will disappear from the atmosphere allowing for intense levels of deadly UV light to reach the surface. Animals in food chains that were dependent on live plants will disappear shortly afterward. At most, animal life could survive about 3 to 100 million years after plant life dies out. Extinction will start with large animals, then smaller animals and flying creatures, then amphibians, followed by reptiles and, finally, invertebrates. In the book The Life and Death of Planet Earth, authors Peter D. Ward and Donald Brownlee state that some animal life may be able to survive in the oceans. Eventually, however, all multicellular life will die out. The first sea animals to go extinct will be large fish, followed by small fish and then, finally, invertebrates. The last animals to go extinct will be animals that do not depend on living plants, such as termites, or those near hydrothermal vents, such as worms of the genus Riftia. The only life left on the Earth after this will be single-celled organisms. A 2026 study by Haq-Misra and Wolf suggests that those plants that use CAM photosynthesis, like cacti could survive until 1.84 billion years from now.
Geology and planetary science	1 billion (Note: Units are short scale.)	27% of the ocean's mass will have been subducted into the mantle. If this were to continue uninterrupted, it would reach an equilibrium where 65% of present-day surface water would be subducted.
Astronomy and astrophysics	1 billion	By this point, the Sagittarius Dwarf Spheroidal Galaxy will have been completely consumed by the Milky Way.
Geology and planetary science	1.1 billion	The Sun's luminosity will have increased by 10%, causing Earth's surface temperatures to reach an average of around 320 K (47 °C; 116 °F). The atmosphere will become a "moist greenhouse", resulting in a runaway evaporation of the oceans. This would cause plate tectonics to stop completely, if not already stopped before this time. Pockets of water may still be present at the poles, allowing abodes for simple life.
Biology	1.2 billion	High estimate until all plant life dies out, assuming some form of photosynthesis is possible despite extremely low carbon dioxide levels. If this is possible, rising temperatures will make any animal life unsustainable from this point on.
Biology	1.3 billion	Eukaryotic life dies out on Earth due to carbon dioxide starvation. Only prokaryotes remain.
Astronomy and astrophysics	1.5 billion	Callisto is captured into the mean-motion resonance of the other Galilean moons of Jupiter, completing the 1:2:4:8 chain. (Currently only Io, Europa and Ganymede participate in the 1:2:4 resonance.)
Astronomy and astrophysics	1.5–1.6 billion	The Sun's rising luminosity causes its circumstellar habitable zone to move outwards; as carbon dioxide rises in Mars's atmosphere, its surface temperature increases to levels akin to Earth during the ice age.
Astronomy and astrophysics	1.5–4.5 billion	Tidal acceleration moves the Moon far enough from the Earth to the point where it can no longer stabilize Earth's axial tilt. As a consequence, Earth's true polar wander becomes chaotic and extreme, leading to dramatic shifts in the planet's climate due to the changing axial tilt.
Biology	1.6 billion	Lower estimate until all remaining life, which by now had been reduced to colonies of unicellular organisms in isolated microenvironments such as high-altitude lakes and caves, goes extinct.
Biology	1.66–1.86 billion	Estimated time until plant life goes extinct if silicate weathering does not increase fast enough to deplete atmospheric carbon dioxide below the minimum for C_{4} photosynthesis, and biosphere decline is instead driven by overheating past the upper limit of 338 K (65 °C; 149 °F) documented for a symbiont of Dichanthelium lanuginosum. If this happens, then the disappearance of other multicellular life on land will happen around the same time.
Astronomy and astrophysics	< 2 billion	The first close passage of the Andromeda Galaxy and the Milky Way.
Geology and planetary science	2 billion	High estimate until the Earth's oceans evaporate if the atmospheric pressure were to decrease via the nitrogen cycle.
Astronomy and astrophysics	2.55 billion	The Sun will have reached a maximum surface temperature of 5,820 K (5,550 °C; 10,020 °F). From then on, it will become gradually cooler while its luminosity will continue to increase.
Geology and planetary science	2.8 billion	Earth's surface temperature will reach around 420 K (147 °C; 296 °F), even at the poles.
Biology	2.8 billion	High estimate until all remaining Earth life goes extinct.
Geology and planetary science	3–4 billion	The Earth's core freezes if the inner core continues to grow in size, based on its current growth rate of 1 mm (0.039 in) in diameter per year. Without its liquid outer core, Earth's magnetosphere shuts down, and solar winds gradually deplete the atmosphere.
Astronomy and astrophysics	c. 3 billion	There is a roughly 1-in-100,000 chance that the Earth will be ejected into interstellar space by a stellar encounter before this point, and a 1-in-300-billion chance that it will be both ejected into space and captured by another star around this point. If this were to happen, any remaining life on Earth could potentially survive for far longer if it survived the interstellar journey.
Geology and planetary science	3.5–4.5 billion	The Sun's luminosity will have increased by 35–40%, causing all water currently present in lakes and oceans to evaporate, if it had not done so earlier. The greenhouse effect caused by the massive, water-rich atmosphere will result in Earth's surface temperature rising to 1,400 K (1,130 °C; 2,060 °F), which is hot enough to melt some surface rock.
Astronomy and astrophysics	4.32 billion	Due to the gradual slowing of Earth's rotation, a day on Earth will be twice as long as it is today. To compensate, either a "leap day" will have to be added to the end of every day, or the length of the day will have to be officially lengthened by one day.
Geology and planetary science	4.5 billion	Mars reaches the same solar flux as that of the Earth when it first formed 4.5 billion years ago from today.
Astronomy and astrophysics	5 billion	There is a roughly one percent chance that Jupiter's gravity may make Mercury's orbit so eccentric as to cross Venus's orbit by this time, sending the inner Solar System into chaos. Other possible scenarios include Mercury colliding with the Sun, being ejected from the Solar System, or colliding with Venus or Earth.
Astronomy and astrophysics	5.4 billion	The Sun, having now exhausted its hydrogen supply, leaves the main sequence and begins evolving into a red giant.
Geology and planetary science	6.5 billion	Mars reaches the same solar radiation flux as Earth today, after which it will suffer a similar fate to the Earth as described above.
Astronomy and astrophysics	6.6 billion	The Sun will experience a helium flash, resulting in its core becoming as bright as the combined luminosity of all the stars in the Milky Way galaxy. This flash, however, will not be visible from outside of the Sun, as most of the energy generated will be used to pull the core out of degeneracy.
Astronomy and astrophysics	7.5 billion	Earth and Mars may become tidally locked with the expanding red giant Sun.
Astronomy and astrophysics	7.59 billion	The Earth and Moon are possibly destroyed by falling into the Sun, just before the Sun reaches the top of its red giant phase. (Note: See the 2001 paper by Rybicki, K. R. and Denis, C. However, according to the latest calculations, this happens with a very high degree of certainty.) Before the final collision, the Moon possibly spirals below Earth's Roche limit, breaking into a ring of debris, most of which falls to the Earth's surface. However, this outcome still remains uncertain as the Sun's total mass loss is ambiguous and a newer study published in 2026 has suggested that the Earth is likely to survive the engulfment. During this era, the Solar System's habitable zone will expand to have a range of 49.4 AU to 71.4 AU, reaching well into the Kuiper Belt.
Astronomy and astrophysics	7.9 billion	The Sun reaches the top of the red-giant branch of the Hertzsprung–Russell diagram, achieving its maximum radius of 256 times the present-day value. In the process, Mercury, Venus and possibly Earth are destroyed.
Astronomy and astrophysics	8 billion	The Sun becomes a carbon–oxygen white dwarf with about 54.05% of its present mass. At this point, if the Earth survives, temperatures on the surface of the planet, as well as the other planets in the Solar System, will begin dropping rapidly, due to the white dwarf Sun emitting much less energy than it does today.
Astronomy and astrophysics	10 billion	The Andromeda Galaxy will have a 50% probability of having collided with the Milky Way, forming an elliptical galaxy dubbed "Milkomeda". If the collision has occurred, there is also a small chance of the Solar System being ejected. The planets of the Solar System will almost certainly not be disturbed by these events.
Astronomy and astrophysics	19 billion	19 billion years is the estimated time until the end of the universe in a Big Crunch. This is a scenario in which dark energy slows and then reverses, causing all stars and galaxies to accelerate towards each other. This would eventually lead to all objects in the universe having the same position.
Astronomy and astrophysics	>22.3 billion	22.3 billion years is the estimated time until the end of the universe in a Big Rip, assuming a model of dark energy with ω = −1.5. If the density of dark energy is less than −1, then the universe's expansion will continue to accelerate and the observable universe will grow ever sparser. Around 200 million years before the Big Rip, galaxy clusters like the Local Group or the Sculptor Group will be destroyed; 60 million years before the Big Rip, all galaxies will begin to lose stars around their edges and will completely disintegrate in another 40 million years; three months before the Big Rip, star systems will become gravitationally unbound, and planets will fly off into the rapidly expanding universe; thirty minutes before the Big Rip, planets, stars, asteroids and even extreme objects like neutron stars and black holes will evaporate into atoms; one hundred zeptoseconds (10^{−19} seconds) before the Big Rip, atoms will break apart. Ultimately, once the Rip reaches the Planck scale, cosmic strings would be disintegrated as well as the fabric of spacetime itself. The universe would enter into a "rip singularity" when all non-zero distances become infinitely large. Whereas a "crunch singularity" involves all matter being infinitely concentrated, in a "rip singularity", all matter is infinitely spread out. Observations of galaxy cluster speeds by the Chandra X-ray Observatory suggest that the value of w is c. −0.991, meaning the Big Rip is unlikely to occur. Meanwhile, more recent data (2018) from the Planck mission indicates the value of w to be c. −1.028 (±0.031), pushing the earliest possible time of the Big Rip to approximately 200 billion years into the future.
Astronomy and astrophysics	28 billion	Neptune's moon Triton falls through the planet's Roche limit, disintegrating into a planetary ring system similar to Saturn's.
Astronomy and astrophysics	50 billion	If the Earth and Moon are not engulfed by the Sun, by this time they will become tidally locked, with each showing only one face to the other. Thereafter, the tidal action of the white dwarf Sun will extract angular momentum from the system, causing the lunar orbit to decay and the Earth's spin to accelerate.
Astronomy and astrophysics	65 billion	The Moon may collide with the Earth or be torn apart to form an orbital ring due to the decay of its orbit, assuming the Earth and Moon have not already been destroyed.
Astronomy and astrophysics	100 billion – 1 trillion	All the ≈47 galaxies of the Local Group will coalesce into a single large galaxy—an expanded "Milkomeda"/"Milkdromeda"; the last galaxies of the Local Group coalescing will mark the effective completion of its evolution.
Astronomy and astrophysics	100–150 billion	The universe's expansion causes all galaxies beyond the former Local Group to disappear beyond the cosmic light horizon, removing them from the observable universe.
Astronomy and astrophysics	150 billion	The universe will have expanded by a factor of 6,000, and the cosmic microwave background will have cooled by the same factor to around 4.5×10^{−4} K. The temperature of the background will continue to cool in proportion to the expansion of the universe.
Astronomy and astrophysics	325 billion	The estimated time by which the expansion of the universe will have isolated all gravitationally bound structures within their own cosmological horizon. At this point, the universe will have expanded by a factor of more than 100 million from today, and even individual exiled stars will be isolated.
Astronomy and astrophysics	800 billion	The expected time when the net light emission from the combined "Milkomeda" galaxy begins to decline as the red dwarf stars pass through their blue dwarf stage of peak luminosity.
Astronomy and astrophysics	1 trillion	A low estimate for the time until star formation ends in galaxies as galaxies are depleted of the gas clouds they need to form stars. The universe's expansion, assuming a constant dark energy density, multiplies the wavelength of the cosmic microwave background by 10^{29}, exceeding the scale of the cosmic light horizon and rendering its evidence of the Big Bang undetectable. However, it may still be possible to determine the expansion of the universe through the study of hypervelocity stars.
Astronomy and astrophysics	1.05 trillion	The estimated time by which the universe will have expanded by a factor of more than 10^{26}, reducing the average particle density to less than one particle per cosmological horizon volume. Beyond this point, particles of unbound intergalactic matter are effectively isolated, and collisions between them cease to affect the future evolution of the universe.
Astronomy and astrophysics	1.4 trillion	The estimated time by which the cosmic background radiation cools to a floor temperature of 10^{−30} K and does not decline further. This residual temperature comes from Unruh radiation, which does not decline over time.
Astronomy and astrophysics	2 trillion	The estimated time by which all objects beyond our former Local Group are redshifted by a factor of more than 10^{53}. Even gamma rays that they emit are stretched so that their wavelengths are greater than the physical diameter of the horizon. The resolution time for such radiation will exceed the physical age of the universe.
Astronomy and astrophysics	4 trillion	The estimated time until the red dwarf star Proxima Centauri, the closest star to the Sun today, at a distance of 4.25 light-years, leaves the main sequence and becomes a white dwarf.
Astronomy and astrophysics	10 trillion	The estimated time of peak habitability in the universe, unless habitability around low-mass stars is suppressed.
Astronomy and astrophysics	12 trillion	The estimated time until the red dwarf star VB 10—as of 2016, the least-massive main-sequence star with an estimated mass of 0.075 M_{☉}—runs out of hydrogen in its core and becomes a white dwarf.
Astronomy and astrophysics	30 trillion	The estimated time for stars (including the Sun) to undergo a close encounter with another star in local stellar neighborhoods. Whenever two stars (or stellar remnants) pass close to each other, their planets' orbits can be disrupted, potentially ejecting them from the system entirely. On average, the closer a planet's orbit to its parent star the longer it takes to be ejected in this manner, because it is gravitationally more tightly bound to the star.
Astronomy and astrophysics	100 trillion	A high estimate for the time by which normal star formation ends in galaxies. This marks the transition from the Stelliferous Era to the Degenerate Era; with too little free hydrogen to form new stars, all remaining stars slowly exhaust their fuel and die. By this time, the universe will have expanded by a factor of approximately 10^{2554}.
Astronomy and astrophysics	110–120 trillion	The time by which all stars in the universe will have exhausted their fuel (the longest-lived stars, low-mass red dwarfs, have lifespans of roughly 10–20 trillion years). After this point, the stellar-mass objects remaining are stellar remnants (white dwarfs, neutron stars, black holes) and brown dwarfs. Collisions between brown dwarfs will create new red dwarfs on a marginal level: on average, about 100 stars will shine in what was once "Milkomeda". Collisions between stellar remnants will create occasional supernovae.
Astronomy and astrophysics	10^{15} (1 quadrillion)	The estimated time until stellar close encounters detach all planets in star systems (including the Solar System) from their orbits. By this point, the black dwarf that was once the Sun will have cooled to 5 K (−268.15 °C; −450.67 °F).
Astronomy and astrophysics	10^{19} to 10^{20} (10–100 quintillion)	The estimated time until 90–99% of brown dwarfs and stellar remnants (including the Sun) are ejected from galaxies. When two objects pass close enough to each other, they exchange orbital energy, with lower-mass objects tending to gain energy. Through repeated encounters, the lower-mass objects can gain enough energy in this manner to be ejected from their galaxy. This process eventually causes "Milkomeda"/"Milkdromeda" to eject the majority of its brown dwarfs and stellar remnants.
Astronomy and astrophysics	10^{20} (100 quintillion)	The estimated time until the Earth collides with the black dwarf Sun due to the decay of its orbit via emission of gravitational radiation, if the Earth is not ejected from its orbit by a stellar encounter or engulfed by the Sun during its red giant phase.
Astronomy and astrophysics	10^{23} (100 sextillion)	Around this timescale, most stellar remnants and other objects are ejected from the remains of their galactic cluster.
Astronomy and astrophysics	10^{30} (1 nonillion)	The estimated time until most or all of the remaining 1–10% of stellar remnants not ejected from galaxies fall into their galaxies' central supermassive black holes. By this point, with binary stars having fallen into each other, and planets into their stars, via emission of gravitational radiation, only solitary objects (stellar remnants, brown dwarfs, ejected planetary-mass objects, black holes) will remain in the universe.
Particle physics	2×10^{36} (2 undecillion)	The estimated time for all nucleons in the observable universe to decay, if the hypothesized proton half-life takes its smallest possible value (8.2 × 10^{33} years). (Note: Around 264 half-lives. Tyson et al. employ the computation with a different value for half-life.)
Particle physics	10^{36}–10^{38} (1–100 undecillion)	The estimated time for all remaining planets and stellar-mass objects, including the Sun, to disintegrate if proton decay can occur.
Particle physics	3×10^{43} (30 tredecillion)	The estimated time for all nucleons in the observable universe to decay, if the hypothesized proton half-life takes the largest possible value of 10^{41} years, assuming that the Big Bang was inflationary and that the same process that made baryons predominate over anti-baryons in the early universe makes protons decay. By this time, if protons do decay, the Black Hole Era, in which black holes are the only remaining celestial objects, begins.
Particle physics	3.14×10^{50} (314 quindecillion)	The estimated time until a micro black hole of one Earth mass today will have decayed into subatomic particles by the emission of Hawking radiation.
Particle physics	10^{65} (100 vigintillion)	Assuming that protons do not decay, the estimated time for rigid objects, from free-floating rocks in space to planets, to rearrange their atoms and molecules via quantum tunnelling. On this timescale, any discrete body of matter "behaves like a liquid" and becomes a smooth sphere due to diffusion and gravity.
Particle physics	1.16×10^{67} (11.6 unvigintillion)	The estimated time until a black hole of one solar mass today will have decayed by the emission of Hawking radiation.
Particle physics	1.54×10^{91}–1.41×10^{92} (15.4–141 novemvigintillion)	The estimated time until the resulting supermassive black hole of "Milkomeda"/"Milkdromeda" from the merger of Sagittarius A* and the P2 concentration during the collision of the Milky Way and Andromeda galaxies will have vanished by the emission of Hawking radiation, assuming it does not accrete any additional matter nor merge with other black holes—though it is most likely that this supermassive black hole will nonetheless merge with other supermassive black holes during the gravitational collapse towards "Milkomeda"/"Milkdromeda" of other Local Group galaxies. This supermassive black hole might be the very last entity from the former Local Group to disappear—and the last evidence of its existence.
Particle physics	10^{106} – 2.1×10^{109}	The estimated time until ultramassive black holes of 10^{14} (100 trillion) solar masses, predicted to form during the gravitational collapse of galaxy superclusters, decay by Hawking radiation. This marks the end of the Black Hole Era. Beyond this time, if protons do decay, the universe enters the Dark Era, in which all physical objects have decayed to subatomic particles, gradually winding down to their final energy state in the heat death of the universe.
Particle physics	10^{161}	A 2018 estimate of Standard Model lifetime before collapse of a false vacuum; 95% confidence interval is 10^{65} to 10^{1383} years due in part to uncertainty about the top quark's mass. (Note: Manuscript was updated after publication; lifetime numbers are taken from the latest revision at arXiv:1707.08124.)
Particle physics	10^{200}	The highest estimate for the time it would take for all nucleons in the observable universe to decay, provided they do not decay via the above process but instead through any one of many different mechanisms allowed in modern particle physics (higher-order baryon non-conservation processes, virtual black holes, sphalerons, etc.) on timescales of 10^{46} to 10^{200} years.
Astronomy and astrophysics	10^{1100–32000}	The estimated time for black dwarfs of 1.2 solar masses or more to undergo supernovae as a result of slow silicon–nickel–iron fusion, as the declining electron fraction lowers their Chandrasekhar limit, assuming protons do not decay.
Astronomy and astrophysics	10^{1500}	Assuming that protons do not decay, the estimated time until all baryonic matter in stellar remnants, planets and planetary-mass objects will have either fused together via pycnonuclear fusion to form iron-56 or decayed from a higher mass element into iron-56 to form iron stars.
Particle physics	$10^{10^{26}}$ (Note: $10^{10^{26}}$ is 1 followed by 10^{26} (100 septillion) zeroes.) (Note: Although listed in years for convenience, the numbers at this point are so vast that their digits would remain unchanged regardless of which conventional units they were listed in, be they nanoseconds or star lifespans.)	A low estimate for the time until all iron stars collapse via quantum tunnelling into black holes, assuming no proton decay or virtual black holes, and that Planck-scale black holes can exist. On this vast timescale, even ultra-stable iron stars will have been destroyed by quantum-tunnelling events. At this lower end of the timescale, iron stars decay directly to black holes, as this decay mode is much more favorable than decaying into a neutron star (which has an expected timescale of $10^{10^{76}}$ years) and later decaying into a black hole. On these timescales, the subsequent evaporation of each resulting black hole into subatomic particles (a process lasting roughly 10^{100} years) and the subsequent shift to the Dark Era is instantaneous.
Particle physics	$10^{10^{50}}$ (Note: $10^{10^{50}}$ is 1 followed by 10^{50} (100 quindecillion) zeroes.)	The estimated time for a Boltzmann brain to appear in the vacuum via a spontaneous entropy decrease.
Particle physics	$10^{10^{76}}$	Highest estimate for the time until all iron stars collapse via quantum tunnelling into neutron stars or black holes, assuming no proton decay or virtual black holes, and that black holes below the Chandrasekhar mass cannot form directly. On these timescales, neutron stars above the Chandrasekhar mass rapidly collapse into black holes, and black holes formed by these processes instantly evaporate into subatomic particles. This is also the highest estimated possible time for the Black Hole Era (and subsequent Dark Era) to commence. Beyond this point, it is almost certain that the universe will be an almost pure vacuum, gradually winding down its energy level until it reaches its final energy state, assuming it does not happen before this time.
Particle physics	$10^{10^{120}}$	The highest estimate for the time it takes for the universe to reach its final energy state.
Particle physics	$10^{10^{10^{56}}}$	Around this vast timeframe, quantum tunnelling in any isolated patch of the universe could generate new inflationary events, resulting in new Big Bangs giving birth to new universes. (Because the total number of ways in which all the subatomic particles in the observable universe can be combined is $10^{10^{115}}$, a number which, when multiplied by $10^{10^{10^{56}}}$, has a difference so small from $10^{10^{10^{56}}}$ that it is functionally zero, this is also the time required for a quantum-tunnelled and quantum fluctuation-generated Big Bang to produce a new universe identical to our own, assuming that every new universe contained at least the same number of subatomic particles and obeyed laws of physics within the landscape predicted by string theory.)

== Humanity and human constructs ==
Keys
Astronomy and astrophysics	Astronomy and astrophysics
Geology and planetary science	Geology and planetary science
Biology	Biology
Particle physics	Particle physics
Mathematics	Mathematics
Technology and culture	Technology and culture

To date, five spacecraft (Voyager 1, Voyager 2, Pioneer 10, Pioneer 11 and New Horizons) are on trajectories that will take them out of the Solar System and into interstellar space. Barring an extremely unlikely collision with some object, all five should persist indefinitely.

	Date (CE) or years from now	Event
technology and culture	3183 CE	The Zeitpyramide (time pyramid), a public art work started in 1993 at Wemding, Germany, is scheduled for completion.
technology and culture	2,000	Maximum lifespan of the data films in Arctic World Archive, a repository that contains code of open-source projects on GitHub along with other data of historical interest (if stored in optimal conditions).
technology and culture	c. 5200 CE	According to Michio Kaku, the time by which humanity will be a Type II civilization, capable of harnessing all the energy of its host star.
technology and culture	c. 6900 CE	Intended opening date of the Westinghouse Time Capsules, buried at the 1939 and 1964 World's Fairs.
technology and culture	28 May 8113 CE	Intended opening date of the Crypt of Civilization, a collection of everyday objects housed at Oglethorpe University.
Particle physics	12,000 CE	The Waste Isolation Pilot Plant for nuclear weapons waste is planned to be protected until this time, with a "Permanent Marker" system designed to warn off visitors through multiple languages (the six UN languages and Navajo) and pictograms. The Human Interference Task Force has provided the theoretical basis for United States plans for future nuclear semiotics.
technology and culture	10,000	Planned lifespan of the Long Now Foundation's several ongoing projects, including a 10,000-year clock known as the Clock of the Long Now, the Rosetta Project and the Long Bet Project. Estimated lifespan of the HD-Rosetta analog disc—an ion beam-etched writing medium on nickel plate, a technology developed at Los Alamos National Laboratory and later commercialized. (The Rosetta Project uses this technology, named after the Rosetta Stone.)
Biology	10,000	Projected lifespan of Norway's Svalbard Global Seed Vault.
technology and culture	10,000	Most probable estimated lifespan of technological civilization, according to Frank Drake's original formulation of the Drake equation.
Biology	10,000	If globalization trends lead to panmixia, human genetic variation will no longer be regionalized, as the effective population size will equal the actual population size.
Mathematics	c. 19,100 CE	Humanity has a 95% probability of extinction by this date, according to Manon Bischoff's formulation of the Doomsday argument.
technology and culture	20,000	The Chernobyl exclusion zone is expected to become habitable again.
Particle physics	24,110	Half-life of plutonium-239. At this point the Chernobyl Exclusion Zone, the 2,600-square-kilometre (1,000 sq mi) area of Ukraine and Belarus left deserted by the 1986 Chernobyl disaster, will return to normal levels of radiation.
Astronomy and astrophysics	25,000	The Arecibo message, a collection of radio data transmitted on 16 November 1974, will reach the distance of its destination: the globular cluster Messier 13. This is the only interstellar radio message sent to such a distant region of the galaxy. There will be a 24-light-year shift in the cluster's position in the galaxy during the time taken for the message to reach it, but as the cluster is 168 light-years in diameter, the message will still reach its destination. Any reply will take at least another 25,000 years from the time of its transmission.
technology and culture	14 September 30,828 CE	Maximum system time for 64-bit NTFS-based Windows operating system.
Astronomy and astrophysics	33,800	Pioneer 10 passes within 3.4 light-years of Ross 248.
Astronomy and astrophysics	42,200	Voyager 2 passes within 1.7 light-years of Ross 248.
Astronomy and astrophysics	44,100	Voyager 1 passes within 1.8 light-years of Gliese 445.
Astronomy and astrophysics	46,600	Pioneer 11 passes within 1.9 light-years of Gliese 445.
Geology and planetary science	50,000	Estimated atmospheric lifetime of tetrafluoromethane, the most durable greenhouse gas.
Astronomy and astrophysics	90,300	Pioneer 10 passes within 0.76 light-years of HIP 117795.
Geology and planetary science	100,000+	Time required to terraform Mars with an oxygen-rich breathable atmosphere, using only plants with solar efficiency comparable to the biosphere currently found on Earth.
Technology and culture	100,000–1 million	Estimated time by which humanity will be a Type III civilization, and could colonize the Milky Way galaxy and become capable of harnessing all the energy of the galaxy, assuming a velocity of 10% the speed of light.
Particle physics	250,000	The estimated minimum time at which the spent plutonium stored at New Mexico's Waste Isolation Pilot Plant will cease to be radiologically lethal to humans.
technology and culture	13 September 275,760 CE	Maximum system time for the JavaScript programming language.
Astronomy and astrophysics	492,300	Voyager 1 passes within 1.3 light-years of HD 28343.
technology and culture	1 million	Estimated lifespan of Memory of Mankind (MOM) self storage-style repository in Hallstatt salt mine in Austria, which stores information on inscribed tablets of stoneware. Planned lifespan of the Human Document Project being developed at the University of Twente in the Netherlands.
Geology and planetary science	1 million	Current glass objects in the environment will be decomposed. Various public monuments composed of hard granite will have eroded by one metre, in a moderate climate and assuming a rate of 1 Bubnoff unit (1 mm in 1,000 years, or ≈1 inch in 25,000 years). Without maintenance, the Great Pyramid of Giza will have eroded to the point where it is unrecognizable. On the Moon, Neil Armstrong's "one small step" footprint at Tranquility Base will erode by this time, along with those left by all twelve Apollo moonwalkers, due to the accumulated effects of space weathering. (Normal erosion processes active on Earth are not present on the Moon because of its almost complete lack of atmosphere.)
Astronomy and astrophysics	1.2 million	Pioneer 11 comes within three light-years of Delta Scuti.
Astronomy and astrophysics	2 million	Pioneer 10 passes near the bright star Aldebaran.
Biology	2 million	Vertebrate species separated for this long will generally undergo allopatric speciation. Evolutionary biologist James W. Valentine predicted that if humanity has been dispersed among genetically isolated space colonies over this time, the galaxy will host an evolutionary radiation of multiple human species with a "diversity of form and adaptation that would astound us". This would be a natural process of isolated populations, unrelated to potential deliberate genetic enhancement technologies.
Astronomy and astrophysics	4 million	Pioneer 11 passes near one of the stars in the constellation Aquila.
Geology and planetary science	7.2 million	Without maintenance, Mount Rushmore will have eroded to the point where it is unrecognizable.
Mathematics	8 million	Humanity has a 95% probability of extinction by this date, according to J. Richard Gott's formulation of the controversial Doomsday argument.
Astronomy and astrophysics	8 million	Most probable lifespan of the Pioneer 10 plaques before the etching is destroyed by poorly understood interstellar erosion processes. The LAGEOS satellites' orbits will decay, and they will re-enter Earth's atmosphere, carrying with them a message to any far future descendants of humanity and a map of the continents as they are expected to appear then.
technology and culture	100 million	Maximal estimated lifespan of technological civilization, according to Frank Drake's original formulation of the Drake equation.
Geology and planetary science	100 million	Future archaeologists should be able to identify an "Urban Stratum" of fossilized great coastal cities, mostly through the remains of underground infrastructure such as building foundations and utility tunnels.
technology and culture	1 billion	Estimated lifespan of "Nanoshuttle memory device" using an iron nanoparticle moved as a molecular switch through a carbon nanotube, a technology developed at the University of California at Berkeley.
Astronomy and astrophysics	1 billion	Estimated lifespan of the two Voyager Golden Records before the information stored on them is rendered unrecoverable. Estimated time for an astroengineering project to alter the Earth's orbit, compensating for the Sun's increasing brightness and outward migration of the habitable zone, accomplished by repeated asteroid gravity assists.
technology and culture	292,277,026,596 CE (292 billion)	Numeric overflow in system time for 64-bit Unix systems.
Astronomy and astrophysics	9 quadrillion	Estimated time the Earth could be kept habitable by construction of a set of megaengineering safeguards such as a large sunshade at the Earth's L1 point, and an artificial sunlight relay powered by fusion reactors in Jupiter's atmosphere.
Astronomy and astrophysics	10^{20} (100 quintillion)	Estimated timescale for the Pioneer and Voyager spacecraft to collide with a star (or stellar remnant).
technology and culture	3×10^{19} – 3×10^{21} (30 quintillion to 3 sextillion)	Estimated lifespan of "Superman memory crystal" data storage using femtosecond laser-etched nanostructures in glass, a technology developed at the University of Southampton, at an ambient temperature of 30 °C (86 °F; 303 K).

== See also ==
- Chronology of the universe
- Far future in fiction
- Far future in religion
  - Eschatology
- Formation and evolution of the Solar System
  - Stability of the Solar System
- List of future astronomical events
- List of future calendar events
- List of radioactive nuclides by half-life
- Location of Earth
  - History of Earth
  - Future of Earth
- Orders of magnitude (time)
- Space and survival
- Stellar evolution
- 3rd millennium
- Timeline of Earth
- Ultimate fate of the universe
