= Quantum foam =

Fluctuation of spacetime on very small scales

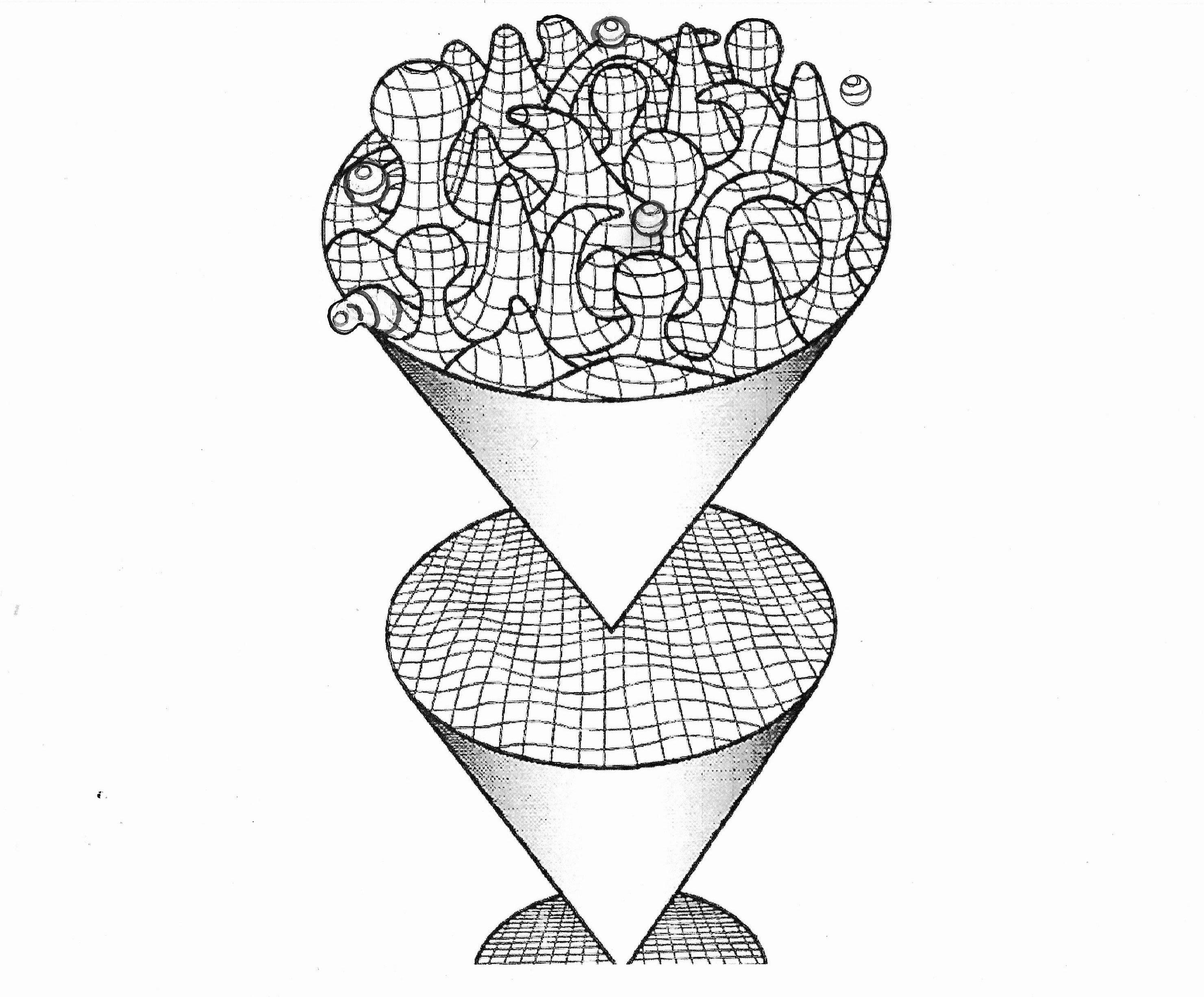
A graphic representation of Wheeler's calculations of what quantum reality may look like at the Planck length

Quantum foam (also known as spacetime foam, or spacetime bubble) is a theoretical quantum fluctuation of spacetime on very small scales due to quantum mechanics. The theory predicts that at this small a scale, particles of matter and antimatter are constantly created and destroyed. These small subatomic objects are called virtual particles. The idea was devised by John Wheeler in 1955.

== Background ==
With an incomplete theory of quantum gravity, it is impossible to be certain what spacetime looks like at small scales. However, there is no definitive reason that spacetime needs to be fundamentally smooth. It is possible that instead, in a quantum theory of gravity, spacetime would consist of many small, ever-changing regions in which space and time are not definite, but fluctuate in a foam-like manner.

John Wheeler suggested that the uncertainty principle might imply that over sufficiently small distances and sufficiently brief intervals of time, the "very geometry of spacetime fluctuates". These fluctuations could be large enough to cause significant departures from the smooth spacetime seen at macroscopic scales, giving spacetime a "foamy" character.

== Experimental results ==
The experimental proof of the Casimir effect, which is possibly caused by virtual particles, is strong evidence for the existence of virtual particles. The g-2 experiment, which predicts the strength of magnets formed by muons and electrons, also supports the existence of virtual particles.

In 2005, during observations of gamma-ray photons arriving from the blazar Markarian 501, MAGIC (Major Atmospheric Gamma-ray Imaging Cherenkov) telescopes detected that some of the photons at different energy levels arrived at different times, suggesting that some of the photons had moved more slowly and thus were in violation of special relativity's notion that the speed of light is constant, a discrepancy which could be explained by the irregularity of quantum foam. Subsequent experiments were, however, unable to confirm the supposed variation on the speed of light due to graininess of space.

Other experiments involving the polarization of light from distant gamma ray bursts have also produced contradictory results. More Earth-based experiments are ongoing or proposed.

== Constraints on the size of quantum fluctuations ==
The fluctuations characteristic of a spacetime foam would be expected to occur on a length scale on the order of the Planck length (≈ 10^{−35} m), but some models of quantum gravity predict much larger fluctuations.

Photons should be slowed by quantum foam, with the rate depending on the wavelength of the photons. This would violate Lorentz invariance. But observations of radiation from nearby quasars by Floyd Stecker of NASA's Goddard Space Flight Center failed to find evidence of violation of Lorentz invariance.

A foamy spacetime also sets limits on the accuracy with which distances can be measured because photons should diffuse randomly through a spacetime foam, similar to light diffusing by passing through fog. This should cause the image quality of very distant objects observed through telescopes to degrade. X-ray and gamma-ray observations of quasars using NASA's Chandra X-ray Observatory, the Fermi Gamma-ray Space Telescope and ground-based gamma-ray observations from the Very Energetic Radiation Imaging Telescope Array (VERITAS) showed no detectable degradation at the farthest observed distances, implying that spacetime is smooth at least down to distances 1,000 times smaller than the nucleus of a hydrogen atom, setting a bound on the size of quantum fluctuations of spacetime.

== Relation to other theories ==
The vacuum fluctuations provide vacuum with a non-zero energy known as vacuum energy.

Spin foam theory is a modern attempt to make Wheeler's idea quantitative.

== See also ==
- False vacuum
- Geon
- Hawking radiation
- Holographic principle
- Loop quantum gravity
- Lorentzian wormhole
- Planck time
- Stochastic quantum mechanics
- String theory
- Wormhole
- Virtual black hole
