= Edward Tryon =

American physicist (1940–2019)

- Born: Edward Polk Tryon; September 4, 1940; Terre Haute, Indiana, US
- Died: December 11, 2019 (aged 79); New York City, US
- Citizenship: United States
- Education: Cornell University; University of California, Berkeley
- Known for: Proposing the idea that our universe originated from a quantum fluctuation of the vacuum
- Scientific career
- Fields: Physicist
- Workplaces: Columbia University; Hunter College of the City University of New York
- Doctoral advisor: Steven Weinberg

Edward P. Tryon (September 4, 1940 – December 11, 2019) was an American scientist and a professor emeritus of physics at Hunter College of the City University of New York (CUNY). He was the first physicist to propose that our universe originated as a quantum fluctuation of the vacuum.

== Early life ==
Tryon was born and raised in Terre Haute, Indiana. He took his first physics course in his junior year at Wiley High School.

== Academia and intellectual influences ==
Tryon entered Cornell University in 1958. He was influenced by Nobel Laureate Hans Bethe, who was one of his professors. He was especially affected by advice that Bethe gave him: "Our intuition is based on our experiences in the macroscopic world. There is no reason to expect our intuition to be valid for microscopic phenomena." He graduated from Cornell University in 1962, earning a bachelor's degree in physics. He would then go on to do his graduate work at the University of California, Berkeley. There he was very much influenced by Steven Weinberg. He took courses taught by Weinberg, who would later become a mentor to him. His doctoral thesis focused on the relationship between general relativity and quantum field theory and was titled: "Classical and Quantum Field-Theoretic Derivations of Gravitational Theory." He graduated from the University of California, Berkeley with a PhD in physics in 1967.

== Dennis Sciama and the idea that the universe is a vacuum fluctuation ==
In 1969, (some versions of this story say 1970), Tryon was at a lecture taking place at Columbia University being given by British cosmologist Dennis Sciama. And when Sciama paused for a moment in his speaking, Tryon suddenly said out loud: "Maybe the universe is a vacuum fluctuation?" Everyone laughed, assuming it was a joke. Embarrassed, he did not explain to anyone that this was not the case. Tryon says he only remembered this incident after he was reminded of it when he published a paper about this subject matter.

== Career ==
Tryon's specialization is in theoretical quark models, theoretical general relativity, and cosmology. In 1973, he proposed that the universe is a large-scale quantum fluctuation in vacuum energy. This is called vacuum genesis or the zero-energy universe hypothesis. He has been quoted as saying, "the universe is simply one of those things that happens from time to time."

In 1967, he began working at Columbia University as a research assistant. In 1968 he began working as an assistant professor and worked there until 1971.

Tryon left Columbia University in 1971 and began working at Hunter College of the City University of New York, where he spent the rest of his academic career teaching as a professor.

== Is the universe a vacuum fluctuation? ==
In the early 1970s, most physicists believed that, within the boundaries of science, one could not speak about what came before the Big Bang. It was almost universally accepted that no scientist could explain why there is something and not nothing. This was the scientific climate as Tryon was settling into working at Hunter College. But soon after arriving he found himself in a writing project that he thought required him to do an exhaustive study of how modern science perceives our universe. In studying the many ways cosmologists see our universe, he thought he had discovered a totally new way that it might have come into existence. He then wrote his idea up as a scientific paper and tried to get it published. He submitted it to Physical Review Letters, but they rejected it. He then sent it to the British scientific journal Nature, hoping it might be accepted as a "letter to the editor". An editor from the journal did not just accept it, but decided to make it a feature article.

The paper appeared in Nature in December, 1973, with the title: "Is the Universe a Vacuum Fluctuation?" It proposed the idea that our universe had originated from a quantum fluctuation of the vacuum. The cosmologist Alexander Vilenkin said of the paper: "Now, what Tryon was suggesting was that our entire universe, with its vast amount of matter, was a huge quantum fluctuation, which somehow failed to disappear for more than ten billion years." Physicist Alan Guth made this comment about the paper: "In his controversial two-page paper, Tryon advanced the startling proposal that on rare occasions, whole universes might materialize from the vacuum, and our universe may have begun this way." This was the first time any scientist had used science to try to explain how our universe may have originated from nothing.

In his paper, Tryon first deals with the idea of how our universe could have come from nothing and yet respect the laws of physics. Following the first law of thermodynamics, energy can neither be created nor destroyed. Tryon needed to assert that our universe could come from nothing without breaking this law of the conservation of energy. He theorized that all the positive energy from mass and all the negative energy from gravity cancel, giving a universe with zero energy. Tryon gives credit for learning this idea from the general relativist Peter Bergmann. The person who first proposed the idea that we might live in a universe with zero net energy because positive energy from mass cancels the negative energy from gravity was the physicist Richard C. Tolman. Because Tryon believed our universe has zero net energy, in his paper Tryon wrote: "If this be the case, then our Universe could have appeared from nowhere without violating any conservation laws."

Tryon then went on to describe how our universe could have come from a quantum fluctuation of the vacuum. He did this by simply applying the currently known scientific laws, including quantum mechanics and quantum field theory, to the era before our currently-known universe was present. Like many physicists he believed that a vacuum, or empty space, existed before our universe existed. According to quantum mechanics and quantum field theory, an apparent vacuum with no matter can support vacuum fluctuations. At the quantum level, because of the uncertainty principle, the law of the conservation of energy can be broken for just a brief moment, causing virtual particles to pop in and out of existence. Tryon says virtual particles also existed in the vacuum that was here before our universe existed, and these quantum fluctuations from nothing (the vacuum) eventually led to one of these particles popping into existence and becoming our universe.

Tryon was not able to explain how one of these virtual particles grows to become a universe like ours, but he does say in his paper "that the laws of physics place no limit on the scale of vacuum fluctuations". He also mentions in his paper how "vacuum fluctuations of our Universe are probably quite rare".

Although Tryon was the first person to suggest that our universe developed from a quantum fluctuation of the vacuum, the German physicist Pascual Jordan was the first person to talk about how a star might be created from the vacuum by a quantum transition. In the 1930s a number of physicists were looking at how to explain how matter arose if we lived in a continual, eternal, universe. Jordan knew how a sun's mass positive energy could cancel out its gravitational negative energy, leaving a sun with zero energy. This led him to speculate what would prevent a quantum transition from the vacuum from creating a new sun. Jordan did not suggest that our universe could have come about by a quantum fluctuation of the vacuum, but rather how matter might be generated within an eternal universe.

In the early 1970s, P. I. Fomin (Peter Ivanovych Fomin, a Ukrainian from Soviet Russia) seems to have independently come up with the idea that our universe could have arisen by a quantum process. However, he did not publish until 1975, almost two years after Tryon, so the scientific community gave Tryon credit for coming up with this idea first.

Tryon also believed that this quantum event had no purpose or cause. In essence, he was saying "that our universe could have originated in this way and emphasized such a creation event would not require a cause". This is why Tryon wrote: "In answer to the question of why it happened, I offer the modest proposal that our Universe is simply one of those things which happen from time to time".

Although Tryon's paper gives the impression that the mystery of where our universe originated is solved, it is not. His paper mentions how there is this "larger space in which our Universe is embedded," but this idea is given only a very vague and short description. Further, although Tryon proposed that our universe came into being from an accident allowed by the laws of physics, he does not indicate what created the laws of physics, leaving the mystery of the creation of the universe incompletely resolved.

== Works ==
- Tryon, Edward P. "Is the Universe a Vacuum Fluctuation?", in Nature, 246(1973), pp. 396–397.

== See also ==
- Zero-energy universe

== Primary sources ==
- Chaisson, Eric (1981). Cosmic Dawn: The Origins of Matter and Life. New York: W. W. Norton & Company. ISBN 978-0-393-30587-6.
- Gleiser, Marcelo (1997). The Dancing Universe: From Creation Myths to the Big Bang. New York: Penguin Books. ISBN 978-0-525-94112-5.
- Gribbin, John (2008). In Search of the Big Bang: The Life and Death of the Universe. Penguin Books. Bibcode:1998isbb.book.....G. ISBN 978-0-14-026989-5.
- Guth, Alan H. (1997). The Inflationary Universe: The Quest for a New Theory of Cosmic Origins. New York: Basic Books. ISBN 978-0-201-14942-5.
- Impey, Chris (2012). How it Began: A Time-Traveler's Guide to the Universe. New York: W. W. Norton & Company. ISBN 978-0-393-08002-5.
- Parker, Barry (1998). Creation: The Story of the Origin and Evolution of the Universe. New York: Plenum Press. ISBN 978-0-306-42952-1.
- Vilenkin, Alex (2006). Many Worlds in One: The Search for Other Universes. New York: Hill and Wang. ISBN 978-0-8090-9523-0.
