= War 3010: The Revolution =

1996 video game

- Cover art
- Developer: Advanced Productions, Inc.
- Publishers: Advanced Productions, Inc.
- Composer: Steve Melillo
- Series: War
- Platform: Super NES
- Release: NA: October 1996
- Genre: Turn-based strategy
- Mode: Single-player

War 3010: The Revolution is a turn-based strategy video game for the Super Nintendo Entertainment System developed and published by American studio Advanced Productions. It was released in 1996 only for North America. The story takes place in 3010 and is the sequel to War 2410.

== Plot ==
Kyllen forces defend their starbase.

In the years following the victory of humanity over the three other factions in the fateful conflict of 2410, most of the known universe has been occupied by an intergalactic menace known as the Kyllen. Slavery, for most of the civilized species, only became an unavoidable reality once the freedom-loving citizens lost their political and social autonomy sometime in the year 2610. Even the humans have lost their freedom and must struggle in slavery amongst the rest of the universe.

== Gameplay ==
In order to save humanity (and the rest of the civilized universe), the player must command a battle fleet; which was seized from the Kyllens by a group of human slaves. A space armada can be maintained each level by upgrading the vessels with the newest weapons and gears. Capturing starbases allow new ships to be constructed within a series of turns. The game uses the same strategy game feel as its predecessor, War 2410. Passwords allow players to play various mini-games (i.e., chess and checkers) in addition to restoring their progress in the game.

== Reception ==
Reception

Aggregate score
Aggregator	Score
GameRankings	49.30% (2 reviews)

In a brief review for GamePro, Scary Larry deemed the game overly complex and said the static graphics and bland music made it dull to play. He gave it a 2.0 out of 5 in every category (graphics, sound, control, and fun factor).
