= Zero-energy universe =

Hypothesis that the total amount of energy in the universe is exactly zero

The zero-energy universe hypothesis proposes that the total amount of energy in the universe is exactly zero: its amount of positive energy in the form of matter is exactly canceled out by its negative energy in the form of gravity. Some physicists, such as Lawrence Krauss, Stephen Hawking or Alexander Vilenkin, call or called this state "a universe from nothingness", although the zero-energy universe model requires both a matter field with positive energy and a gravitational field with negative energy to exist. The hypothesis is broadly discussed in popular sources. Other cancellation examples include the expected symmetric prevalence of right- and left-handed angular momenta of objects ("spin" in common parlance), the observed flatness of the universe, the equal prevalence of positive and negative charges, opposing particle spin in quantum mechanics, as well as the crests and troughs of electromagnetic waves, among other possible examples in nature.

== History ==
During World War II, Pascual Jordan first suggested that since the positive energy of a star's mass and the negative energy of its gravitational field together may have zero total energy, conservation of energy would not prevent a star being created by a quantum transition of the vacuum. George Gamow recounted putting this idea to Albert Einstein: "Einstein stopped in his tracks and, since we were crossing a street, several cars had to stop to avoid running us down". Elaboration of the concept was slow, with the first notable calculation being performed by Richard Feynman in 1962. The first known publication on the topic was in 1973, when Edward Tryon proposed in the journal Nature that the universe emerged from a large-scale quantum fluctuation of vacuum energy, resulting in its positive mass-energy being exactly balanced by its negative gravitational potential energy. In the subsequent decades, development of the concept was constantly plagued by the dependence of the calculated masses on the selection of the coordinate systems. In particular, a problem arises due to energy associated with coordinate systems co-rotating with the entire universe. A first constraint was derived in 1987 when Alan Guth published a proof of gravitational energy being negative. The question of the mechanism permitting generation of both positive and negative energy from null initial solution was not understood, and an ad hoc solution with cyclic time was proposed by Stephen Hawking in 1988.

In 1994, development of the theory resumed following the publication of a work by Nathan Rosen, in which Rosen described a special case of a closed universe. In 1995, J.V. Johri demonstrated that the total energy of Rosen's universe is zero in any universe compliant with a Friedmann–Lemaître–Robertson–Walker metric, and proposed a mechanism of inflation-driven generation of matter in a young universe. The zero energy solution for Minkowski space representing an observable universe was provided in 2009.

In his book Brief Answers to the Big Questions, Hawking explains:

The laws of physics demand the existence of something called "negative energy".

To help you get your head around this weird but crucial concept, let me draw on a simple analogy. Imagine a man wants to build a hill on a flat piece of land. The hill will represent the universe. To make this hill he digs a hole in the ground and uses that soil to dig his hill. But of course he's not just making a hill—he's also making a hole, in effect a negative version of the hill. The stuff that was in the hole has now become the hill, so it all perfectly balances out. This is the principle behind what happened at the beginning of the universe. When the Big Bang produced a massive amount of positive energy, it simultaneously produced the same amount of negative energy. In this way, the positive and the negative add up to zero, always. It's another law of nature. So where is all this negative energy today? It's in the third ingredient in our cosmic cookbook: it's in space. This may sound odd, but according to the laws of nature concerning gravity and motion—laws that are among the oldest in science—space itself is a vast store of negative energy. Enough to ensure that everything adds up to zero.

Some research in quantum cosmology provide a concrete realization of the zero energy universe hypothesis.

== Experimental constraints ==
Experimental proof for the observable universe being a "zero-energy universe" is currently inconclusive. Gravitational energy from visible matter accounts for 26–37% of the observed total mass–energy density. Therefore, to fit the concept of a "zero-energy universe" to the observed universe, other negative energy reservoirs besides gravity from baryonic matter are necessary. These reservoirs are frequently assumed to be dark matter.

== See also ==
- A Universe from Nothing
- False vacuum
- Heat death of the universe
- List of cosmology paradoxes – List of statements that appear to contradict themselves
- Ultimate fate of the universe
