= Virtual particle =

Transient quantum fluctuation (physics)

A virtual particle is a theoretical transient particle that exhibits some of the characteristics of an ordinary particle, while having its existence limited by the uncertainty principle, which allows the virtual particles to spontaneously emerge from vacuum at short time and space ranges. The concept of virtual particles arises in the perturbation theory of quantum field theory (QFT) where interactions between ordinary particles are described in terms of exchanges of virtual particles. A process involving virtual particles can be described by a schematic representation known as a Feynman diagram, in which virtual particles are represented by internal lines.

Virtual particles do not necessarily carry the same mass as the corresponding ordinary particle, although they always conserve energy and momentum. The closer its characteristics come to those of ordinary particles, the longer the virtual particle exists. They are important in the physics of many processes, including particle scattering and Casimir forces. In quantum field theory, forces—such as the electromagnetic repulsion or attraction between two charges—can be thought of as resulting from the exchange of virtual photons between the charges. Virtual photons are the exchange particles for the electromagnetic interaction.

The term is somewhat loose and vaguely defined, in that it refers to the view that the world is made up of "real particles". "Real particles" are better understood to be excitations of the underlying quantum fields. Virtual particles are also excitations of the underlying fields, but are "temporary" in the sense that they appear in calculations of interactions, but never as asymptotic states or indices to the scattering matrix. The accuracy and use of virtual particles in calculations is firmly established, but as they cannot be detected in experiments, deciding how to precisely describe them is a topic of debate. Although widely used, they are by no means a necessary feature of QFT, but rather are mathematical conveniences — as demonstrated by lattice field theory, which avoids using the concept altogether.

== Properties ==
The concept of virtual particles arises in the perturbation theory of quantum field theory, an approximation scheme in which interactions (in essence, forces) between actual particles are calculated in terms of exchanges of virtual particles. Such calculations are often performed using schematic representations known as Feynman diagrams, in which virtual particles appear as internal lines. By expressing the interaction in terms of the exchange of a virtual particle with four-momentum q, where q is given by the difference between the four-momenta of the particles entering and leaving the interaction vertex, both momentum and energy are conserved at the interaction vertices of the Feynman diagram.

A virtual particle does not precisely obey the energy–momentum relation m^{2}c^{4} = E^{2} − p^{2}c^{2}. Its kinetic energy may not have the usual relationship to velocity. It can be negative. This is expressed by the phrase off mass shell. The probability amplitude for a virtual particle to exist tends to be canceled out by destructive interference over longer distances and times. As a consequence, a real photon is massless and thus has only two polarization states, whereas a virtual one, being effectively massive, has three polarization states.

Quantum tunnelling may be considered a manifestation of virtual particle exchanges. The range of forces carried by virtual particles is limited by the uncertainty principle, which regards energy and time as conjugate variables; thus, virtual particles of larger mass have more limited range.

Written in the usual mathematical notations, in the equations of physics, there is no mark of the distinction between virtual and actual particles. The amplitudes of processes with a virtual particle interfere with the amplitudes of processes without it, whereas for an actual particle the cases of existence and non-existence cease to be coherent with each other and do not interfere any more. In the quantum field theory view, actual particles are viewed as being detectable excitations of underlying quantum fields. Virtual particles are also viewed as excitations of the underlying fields, but appear only as forces, not as detectable particles. They are "temporary" in the sense that they appear in some calculations, but are not detected as single particles. Thus, in mathematical terms, they never appear as indices to the scattering matrix, which is to say, they never appear as the observable inputs and outputs of the physical process being modelled.

There are two principal ways in which the notion of virtual particles appears in modern physics. They appear as intermediate terms in Feynman diagrams; that is, as terms in a perturbative calculation. They also appear as an infinite set of states to be summed or integrated over in the calculation of a semi-non-perturbative effect. In the latter case, it is sometimes said that virtual particles contribute to a mechanism that mediates the effect, or that the effect occurs through the virtual particles.

== Manifestations ==
There are many observable physical phenomena that arise in interactions involving virtual particles. For bosonic particles that exhibit rest mass when they are free and actual, virtual interactions are characterized by the relatively short range of the force interaction produced by particle exchange. Confinement can lead to a short range, too. Examples of such short-range interactions are the strong and weak forces, and their associated field bosons.

For the gravitational and electromagnetic forces, the zero rest-mass of the associated boson particle permits long-range forces to be mediated by virtual particles. However, in the case of photons, power and information transfer by virtual particles is a relatively short-range phenomenon (existing only within a few wavelengths of the field-disturbance, which carries information or transferred power), as for example seen in the characteristically short range of inductive and capacitative effects in the near field zone of coils and antennas.

Some field interactions which may be seen in terms of virtual particles are:

- The Coulomb force (static electric force) between electric charges. It is caused by the exchange of virtual photons. In symmetric 3-dimensional space this exchange results in the inverse square law for electric force. Since the photon has no mass, the coulomb potential has an infinite range.
- The magnetic field between magnetic dipoles. It is caused by the exchange of virtual photons. In symmetric 3-dimensional space, this exchange results in the inverse cube law for magnetic force. Since the photon has no mass, the magnetic potential has an infinite range. Even though the range is infinite, the time lapse allowed for a virtual photon existence is not infinite.
- Electromagnetic induction. This phenomenon transfers energy to and from a magnetic coil via a changing (electro)magnetic field.
- The strong nuclear force between quarks is the result of interaction of virtual gluons. The residual of this force outside of quark triplets (neutron and proton) holds neutrons and protons together in nuclei, and is due to virtual mesons such as the pi meson and rho meson.
- The weak nuclear force is the result of exchange by virtual W and Z bosons.
- The spontaneous emission of a photon during the decay of an excited atom or excited nucleus; such a decay is prohibited by ordinary quantum mechanics and requires the quantization of the electromagnetic field for its explanation.
- The Casimir effect, where the ground state of the quantized electromagnetic field causes attraction between a pair of electrically neutral metal plates.
- The van der Waals force, which is partly due to the Casimir effect between two atoms.
- Vacuum polarization, which involves pair production or the decay of the vacuum, which is the spontaneous production of particle-antiparticle pairs (such as electron-positron).
- Lamb shift of positions of atomic levels.
- The impedance of free space, which defines the ratio between the electric field strength |E| and the magnetic field strength |H|: Z_{0} = |E| / |H|.
- Much of the so-called near-field of radio antennas, where the magnetic and electric effects of the changing current in the antenna wire and the charge effects of the wire's capacitive charge may be (and usually are) important contributors to the total EM field close to the source, but both of which effects are dipole effects that decay with increasing distance from the antenna much more quickly than do the influence of "conventional" electromagnetic waves that are "far" from the source. (Note: "Far" in terms of ratio of antenna length or diameter, to wavelength.) These far-field waves, for which E is (in the limit of long distance) equal to cB, are composed of actual photons. Actual and virtual photons are mixed near an antenna, with the virtual photons responsible only for the "extra" magnetic-inductive and transient electric-dipole effects, which cause any imbalance between E and cB. As distance from the antenna grows, the near-field effects (as dipole fields) die out more quickly, and only the "radiative" effects that are due to actual photons remain as important effects. Although virtual effects extend to infinity, they drop off in field strength as 1/r^{2} rather than the field of EM waves composed of actual photons, which drop as 1/r. (Note: The electrical power in the fields, respectively, decrease as 1/r^{4} and 1/r^{2}.) (Note: See near and far field for a more detailed discussion. See near-field communication for practical communications applications of near fields.)

Most of these have analogous effects in solid-state physics; indeed, one can often gain a better intuitive understanding by examining these cases. In semiconductors, the roles of electrons, positrons and photons in field theory are replaced by electrons in the conduction band, holes in the valence band, and phonons or vibrations of the crystal lattice. A virtual particle is in a virtual state where the probability amplitude is not conserved. Examples of macroscopic virtual phonons, photons, and electrons in the case of the tunneling process were presented by Günter Nimtz and Alfons A. Stahlhofen.

== Feynman diagrams ==
One particle exchange scattering diagram

The calculation of scattering amplitudes in theoretical particle physics requires the use of some rather large and complicated integrals over a large number of variables. These integrals do, however, have a regular structure, and may be represented as Feynman diagrams. The appeal of the Feynman diagrams is strong, as it allows for a simple visual presentation of what would otherwise be a rather arcane and abstract formula. In particular, part of the appeal is that the outgoing legs of a Feynman diagram can be associated with actual, on-shell particles. Thus, it is natural to associate the other lines in the diagram with particles as well, called the "virtual particles". In mathematical terms, they correspond to the propagators appearing in the diagram.

In the adjacent image, the solid lines correspond to actual particles (of momentum p_{1} and so on), while the dotted line corresponds to a virtual particle carrying momentum k. For example, if the solid lines were to correspond to electrons interacting by means of the electromagnetic interaction, the dotted line would correspond to the exchange of a virtual photon. In the case of interacting nucleons, the dotted line would be a virtual pion. In the case of quarks interacting by means of the strong force, the dotted line would be a virtual gluon, and so on.

One-loop diagram with fermion propagator

Virtual particles may be mesons or vector bosons, as in the example above; they may also be fermions. However, in order to preserve quantum numbers, most simple diagrams involving fermion exchange are prohibited. The image to the right shows an allowed diagram, a one-loop diagram. The solid lines correspond to a fermion propagator, the wavy lines to bosons.

== Vacuums ==
In formal terms, a particle is considered to be an eigenstate of the particle number operator a^{†}a, where a is the particle annihilation operator and a^{†} the particle creation operator (sometimes collectively called ladder operators). In many cases, the particle number operator does not commute with the Hamiltonian for the system. This implies the number of particles in an area of space is not a well-defined quantity but, like other quantum observables, is represented by a probability distribution. Since these particles are not certain to exist, they are called virtual particles or vacuum fluctuations of vacuum energy. In a certain sense, they can be understood to be a manifestation of the time-energy uncertainty principle in a vacuum.

An important example of the "presence" of virtual particles in a vacuum is the Casimir effect. Here, the explanation of the effect requires that the total energy of all of the virtual particles in a vacuum can be added together. Thus, although the virtual particles themselves are not directly observable in the laboratory, they do leave an observable effect: Their zero-point energy results in forces acting on suitably arranged metal plates or dielectrics. On the other hand, the Casimir effect can be interpreted as the relativistic van der Waals force.

== Pair production ==
Virtual particles are often popularly described as coming in pairs, a particle and antiparticle, which can be of any kind. These pairs exist for an extremely short time, and then mutually annihilate, or in some cases, the pair may be boosted apart using external energy so that they avoid annihilation and become actual particles, as described below.

This may occur in one of two ways. In an accelerating frame of reference, the virtual particles may appear to be actual to the accelerating observer; this is known as the Unruh effect. In short, the vacuum of a stationary frame appears, to the accelerated observer, to be a warm gas of actual particles in thermodynamic equilibrium.

Another example is pair production in very strong electric fields, sometimes called vacuum decay. If, for example, a pair of atomic nuclei are merged to very briefly form a nucleus with a charge greater than about 140, (that is, larger than about the inverse of the fine-structure constant, which is a dimensionless quantity), the strength of the electric field will be such that it will be energetically favorable to create positron–electron pairs out of the vacuum or Dirac sea, with the electron attracted to the nucleus to annihilate the positive charge. This pair-creation amplitude was first calculated by Julian Schwinger in 1951.

== Compared to actual particles ==
As a consequence of quantum mechanical uncertainty, any object or process that exists for a limited time or in a limited volume cannot have a precisely defined energy or momentum. For this reason, virtual particles – which exist only temporarily as they are exchanged between ordinary particles – do not typically obey the mass-shell relation; the longer a virtual particle exists, the more the energy and momentum approach the mass-shell relation.

The lifetime of real particles is typically vastly longer than the lifetime of the virtual particles. Electromagnetic radiation consists of real photons which may travel light years between the emitter and absorber, but (Coulombic) electrostatic attraction and repulsion is a relatively short-range force that is a consequence of the exchange of virtual photons.

== See also ==
- Anomalous photovoltaic effect
- False vacuum
- Force carrier
- Quasiparticle
- Static forces and virtual-particle exchange
- Zero-energy universe
- Vacuum Rabi oscillation
- Quantum foam
- Virtual black hole
- Added mass
