= War 2410 =

1995 video game

- Box art
- Developer(s): Advanced Productions
- Publisher(s): Advanced Productions
- Composer(s): Susan Lee; Jeff Rogan
- Series: War
- Platform(s): Super NES
- Release: NA: December 1995
- Genre(s): Strategy
- Mode(s): Single-player

War 2410 is a turn-based strategy video game for the Super Nintendo Entertainment System developed by American studio Advanced Productions that takes place in the year 2410.

== Story ==
In the year 2003, scientists have developed the perfect soldier through genetic engineering. Hundreds of years of technological advances gave them the sentience needed to ultimately make decisions for themselves on the battlefield (and beyond). Three groups of soldiers were originally designed to protect humanity have revolted against their masters after becoming completely self-aware. As a result, four factions are fighting it out for control of the Earth more than 400 years after the scientific breakthrough was first realized.

This war would decide the fate of humanity and set the stage clear for its sequel, War 3010: The Revolution. A mysterious intergalactic force known as the Kyllen would end up occupying the universe nearly 200 years after the end of this game's story line.

== Gameplay ==
Players always have the option to wait for the enemy to approach them before attacking.

The player is in command of the GDA (Global Defense Alliance) and the primary objective for the game's twenty missions is the total annihilation of M.A.R.S. (a group of unsavory superhumans who have turned against their masters), the Orcs, and the Cromes (which can be summarized as a group of self-sentient, self-aware combat robots). Capturing a lab results in the ability to build a superweapon to destroy the other factions; some missions require players to capture enemy bases for the war effort. Players can take all the time that they want in these missions due to a lack of any form of limitation regarding time. Each side has infantry, tanks and the air force needed to get the job done.

Military-style medals can be earned through performing various acts of bravery. A complete map can be viewed as a part of the game's "radar intelligence" probe. Later missions tend to cover more than one quadrant of this 16-grid radar screen.

== Reception ==
Allgame gave War 2410 a rating of 2.5 out of a possible 5 stars. Nintendo Power gave the game an overall rating of 3.25 out of 5 (the equivalent to a ranking of 65% or a letter grade of C).
