= Anomalous photovoltaic effect =

The anomalous photovoltaic effect (APE) is a type of photovoltaic effect which occurs in certain semiconductors and insulators. The "anomalous" refers to those cases where the photovoltage (i.e., the open-circuit voltage caused by the light) is larger than the band gap of the corresponding semiconductor. In some cases, the voltage may reach thousands of volts.

Although the voltage is unusually high, the short-circuit current is unusually low. Overall, materials that exhibit the anomalous photovoltaic effect have very low power generation efficiencies, and are never used in practical power-generation systems.

There are several situations in which APE can arise.

First, in polycrystalline materials, each microscopic grain can act as a photovoltaic. Then the grains add in series, so that the overall open-circuit voltage across the sample is large, potentially much larger than the bandgap.

Second, in a similar manner, certain ferroelectric materials can develop stripes consisting of parallel ferroelectric domains, where each domain acts like a photovoltaic and each domain wall acts like a contact connecting the adjacent photovoltaics (or vice versa). Again, domains add in series, so that the overall open-circuit voltage is large.

Third, a perfect single crystal with a non-centrosymmetric structure can develop a giant photovoltage. This is specifically called the bulk photovoltaic effect (BPV effect), and occurs because of non-centrosymmetry. Specifically, the electron processes—photo-excitation, scattering, and relaxation—occur with different probabilities for electron motion in one direction versus the opposite direction.

The compound α-In_{2}Se_{3} can be made to exhibit the bulk photovoltaic effect and outperform traditional solar cells.

== Series-sum of grains in a polycrystal ==
=== History ===
This effect was discovered by Starkiewicz et al. in 1946 on PbS films and was later observed on other semiconducting polycrystalline films including CdTe, Silicon, Germanium, ZnTe and InP, as well as on amorphous silicon films and in nanocrystalline silicon systems. Observed photovoltages were found to reach hundreds, and in some cases even thousands of volts. The films in which this effect was observed were generally thin semiconducting films that were deposited by vacuum evaporation onto a heated insulating substrate, held at an angle with respect to the direction of the incident vapor. However, the photovoltage was found to be very sensitive to the conditions and procedure at which the samples were prepared. This made it difficult to get reproducible results which is probably the reason why no satisfactory model for it has been accepted thus far. Several models were, however, suggested to account for the extraordinary phenomenon and they are briefly outlined below.

The oblique deposition can lead to several structure asymmetries in the films. Among the first attempts to explain the APE were few that treated the film as a single entity, such as considering the variation of sample thickness along its length or a non-uniform distribution of electron traps. However, studies that followed generally supported models that explain the effect as resulting from a series of microelements contributing additively to the net photovoltage. The more popular models used to explain the photovoltage are reviewed below.

=== The Photo–Dember effect ===
When photogenerated electrons and holes have different mobilities, a potential difference can be created between the illuminated and non-illuminated faces of a semiconductor slab. Generally this potential is created through the depth of the slab, whether it is a bulk semiconductor or a polycrystalline film. The difference between these cases is that in the latter, a photovoltage can be created in each one of the microcrystallites. As was mentioned above, in the oblique deposition process inclined crystallites are formed in which one face can absorb light more than the other. This may cause a photovoltage to be generated along the film, as well as through its depth. The transfer of carriers at the surface of crystallites is assumed to be hindered by the presence of some unspecified layer with different properties, thus cancellation of consecutive Dember voltages is being prevented. To explain the polarity of the PV which is independent of the illumination direction one must assume that there exists a large difference in recombination rates at opposite faces of a crystallite, which is a weakness of this model.

=== The structure transition model ===
This model suggests that when a material crystallizes both in cubic and hexagonal structures, an asymmetric barrier can be formed by a residual dipole layer at the interface between the two structures. A potential barrier is formed due to a combination of the band gap difference and the electric fields produced at the interface. One should remember that this model can be invoked to explain anomalous PV effect only in those materials that can demonstrate two types of crystal structure.

=== The p-n junction model ===
It was suggested by Starkiewicz that the anomalous PV is developed due to a distribution gradient of positive and negative impurity ions through the microcrystallites, with an orientation such as to give a non-zero total photovoltage. This is equivalent to an array of p-n junctions. However, the mechanism by which such p-n junctions may be formed was not explained.

=== The surface photovoltage model ===
The interface between crystallites may contain traps for charge carriers. This may lead to a surface charge and an opposite space charge region in the crystallites, in case that the crystallites are small enough. Under illumination of the inclined crystallites electron-hole pairs are generated and cause a compensation of the charge in the surface and within the crystallites. If it is assumed that the optical absorption depth is much less than the space charge region in the crystallites, then, because of their inclined shape more light is absorbed in one side than in the other. Thus a difference in the reduction of the charge is created between the two sides. This way a photovoltage parallel to the surface is developed in each crystallite.

== Bulk photovoltaic effect in a non-centrosymmetric single crystal ==
A perfect single crystal with a non-centrosymmetric structure can develop a giant photovoltage. This is specifically called the bulk photovoltaic effect, and occurs because of non-centrosymmetry. The electron processes like photo-excitation, scattering, and relaxation may occur with different probabilities for electrons moving one direction versus the opposite direction.

This effect was first discovered in the 1960s. It has been observed in lithium niobate (LiNbO_{3}), barium titanate (BaTiO_{3}) and many other materials.

Theoretical calculations using density functional theory or other methods can predict the extent to which a material will exhibit the bulk photovoltaic effect.

=== Simple example ===
An example of a simple system that would exhibit the bulk photovoltaic effect. See text for description.

Shown at right is an example of a simple system that would exhibit the bulk photovoltaic effect. There are two electronic levels per unit cell, separated by a large energy gap, say 3 eV. The blue arrows indicate radiative transitions, i.e. an electron can absorb a UV photon to go from A to B, or it can emit a UV photon to go from B to A. The purple arrows indicate nonradiative transitions, i.e. an electron can go from B to C by emitting many phonons, or can go from C to B by absorbing many phonons.

When light is shining, an electron in response to the time-varying electric field of light will occasionally move right by absorbing a photon and going from A to B to C. However, it will almost never move in the reverse direction, C to B to A, because the transition from C to B cannot be excited by photons, but instead requires an improbably large thermal fluctuation. Therefore, there is a net rightward photocurrent.

Because the electrons undergo a "shift" each time they absorb a photon (on average), this dc photocurrent with amplitude proportional to the square of the applied field is sometimes called a "shift current".

=== Distinguishing features ===
There are several aspects of the bulk photovoltaic effect that distinguish it from other kinds of effects: In the power-generating region of the I-V curve (between open-circuit and short-circuit), electrons are moving in the opposite direction that you would expect from the drift-diffusion equation, i.e. electrons are moving towards higher fermi level or holes are moving towards lower fermi level. This is unusual: For example, in a normal silicon solar cell, electrons move in the direction of decreasing electron-quasi-fermi level, and holes move in the direction of increasing hole-quasi-fermi-level, consistent with the drift-diffusion equation. Power generation is possible only because the quasi-fermi-levels are split. A bulk photovoltaic, by contrast, can generate power without any splitting of quasi-fermi-levels.

This also explains why large open-circuit voltages tend to be seen only in crystals that (in the dark) have very low conductivity: Any electrons that can freely move through the crystal (i.e., not requiring photons to move) will follow the drift-diffusion equation, which means that these electrons will subtract from the photocurrent and reduce the photovoltaic effect.

Each time one electron absorbs one photon (in the power-generating region of the I-V curve), the resulting electron displacement is, on average, at most one or two unit cells or mean-free-paths (this displacement is sometimes called the "anisotropy distance"). This is required because if an electron is excited into a mobile, delocalized state, and then it scatters a few times, then its direction is now randomized and it will naturally start following the drift-diffusion equation. However, in the bulk photovoltaic effect, the desired net electron motion is opposite the direction predicted by the drift-diffusion equation.

For example, it might be the case that when an electron absorbs a photon, it is disproportionately likely to wind up in a state where it is moving leftward. And perhaps each time a photon excites an electron, the electron moves leftward a bit and then immediately relaxes into ("gets stuck in") an immobile state—until it absorbs another photon and the cycle repeats. In this situation, a leftward electron current is possible despite an electric field pushing electrons in the opposite direction. However, when a photon excites an electron, it does not quickly relax back to an immobile state, but instead keeps moving around the crystal and scattering randomly, then the electron will eventually "forget" that it was moving left, and it will wind up being pulled rightward by the electric field. Again, the total leftward motion of an electron, per photon absorbed, cannot be much larger than the mean free path.

A consequence is that the quantum efficiency of a thick device is extremely low. It may require millions of photons to bring a single electron from one electrode to the other. As the thickness increases, the current goes down as much as the voltage goes up.

In some cases, the current has a different sign depending on the light polarization. This would not occur in an ordinary solar cell like silicon.

=== Applications ===
The bulk photovoltaic effect is believed to play a role in the photorefractive effect in lithium niobate.

== See also ==
- Semiconductors
- Photovoltaic effect
- Virtual particle
