= Bubnoff unit =

Unit of rate of erosion in geology

The Bubnoff unit (abbreviated B) is a unit of speed defined as 1 micron (micrometer) per year. In other words, 1 B is equal to 1 meter in 1,000,000 years or 1 millimeter in 1 millennium. It was defined in 1969.

The Bubnoff unit is employed in geology to measure rates of lowering of earth surfaces due to erosion and is named after the Russian (German-Baltic) geologist Serge von Bubnoff (1888–1957). An erosion speed of 1 B also means that 1 m^{3} of earth is being removed from an area of 1 km^{2} in 1 year. Compared to everyday phenomena, erosion is under most circumstances (excluding rapid events like landslides) an extremely slow process, calling for such a specialized unit. For instance, the current average rate of erosion over the Earth's landmasses has been estimated at 30 B (30 m in a million years). There are, however, great regional differences in erosion speed. As an extreme example, the watershed area of the Semani River in Albania is eroding at a rate of almost 3000 B (3 millimeters per year), the river having been estimated to transport about 4600 tons of earth per year from the average square kilometer in its watershed.

The Bubnoff unit was introduced because of a desire for a standard unit to replace the multitude of units in use, such as feet per year, centimeters per year, meters per decade, and so on. One criticism leveled was that by introducing the Bubnoff unit, it would obscure the rate of erosion behind a unit no one besides specialists understood.

1 m/s is equal to approximately 31.558 trillion B.
