= Vacuum energy =

Background energy existing in space

Vacuum energy is an underlying background energy that exists in space throughout the entire universe. The vacuum energy is a special case of zero-point energy that relates to the quantum vacuum.

Unsolved problem in physics
Why does the zero-point energy of the vacuum not cause a large cosmological constant? What cancels it out?
More unsolved problems in physics

The effects of vacuum energy can be experimentally observed in various phenomena such as spontaneous emission, the Casimir effect, and the Lamb shift, and are thought to influence the behavior of the Universe on cosmological scales. Using the upper limit of the cosmological constant, the vacuum energy of free space has been estimated to be 10^{−9} joules (10^{−2} ergs), or ~5 GeV per cubic meter. However, in quantum electrodynamics, consistency with the principle of Lorentz covariance and with the magnitude of the Planck constant suggests a much larger value of 10^{113} joules per cubic meter. This huge discrepancy is known as the cosmological constant problem or, colloquially, the "vacuum catastrophe".

== Origin ==
Quantum field theory states that all fundamental fields, such as the electromagnetic field, must be quantized at every point in space. A field in physics may be envisioned as if space were filled with interconnected vibrating balls and springs, and the strength of the field is like the displacement of a ball from its rest position. The theory requires "vibrations" in, or more accurately changes in the strength of, such a field to propagate as per the appropriate wave equation for the particular field in question. The second quantization of quantum field theory requires that each such ball–spring combination be quantized, that is, that the strength of the field be quantized at each point in space. Canonically, if the field at each point in space is a simple harmonic oscillator, its quantization places a quantum harmonic oscillator at each point. Excitations of the field correspond to the elementary particles of particle physics. Thus, according to the theory, even the vacuum has a vastly complex structure and all calculations of quantum field theory must be made in relation to this model of the vacuum.

The theory considers vacuum to implicitly have the same properties as a particle, such as spin or polarization in the case of light, energy, and so on. According to the theory, most of these properties cancel out on average leaving the vacuum empty in the literal sense of the word. One important exception, however, is the vacuum energy or the vacuum expectation value of the energy. The quantization of a simple harmonic oscillator requires the lowest possible energy, or zero-point energy of such an oscillator to be

$${E}=\tfrac12 \hbar \omega \$$

Summing over all possible oscillators at all points in space gives an infinite quantity. To remove this infinity, one may argue that only differences in energy are physically measurable, much as the concept of potential energy has been treated in classical mechanics for centuries. This argument is the underpinning of the theory of renormalization. In all practical calculations, this is how the infinity is handled.

Vacuum energy can also be thought of in terms of virtual particles (also known as vacuum fluctuations) which are created and destroyed out of the vacuum. These particles are always created out of the vacuum in particle–antiparticle pairs, which in most cases shortly annihilate each other and disappear. However, these particles and antiparticles may interact with others before disappearing, a process which can be mapped using Feynman diagrams. Note that this method of computing vacuum energy is mathematically equivalent to having a quantum harmonic oscillator at each point and, therefore, suffers the same renormalization problems.

Additional contributions to the vacuum energy come from spontaneous symmetry breaking in quantum field theory.

== Implications ==
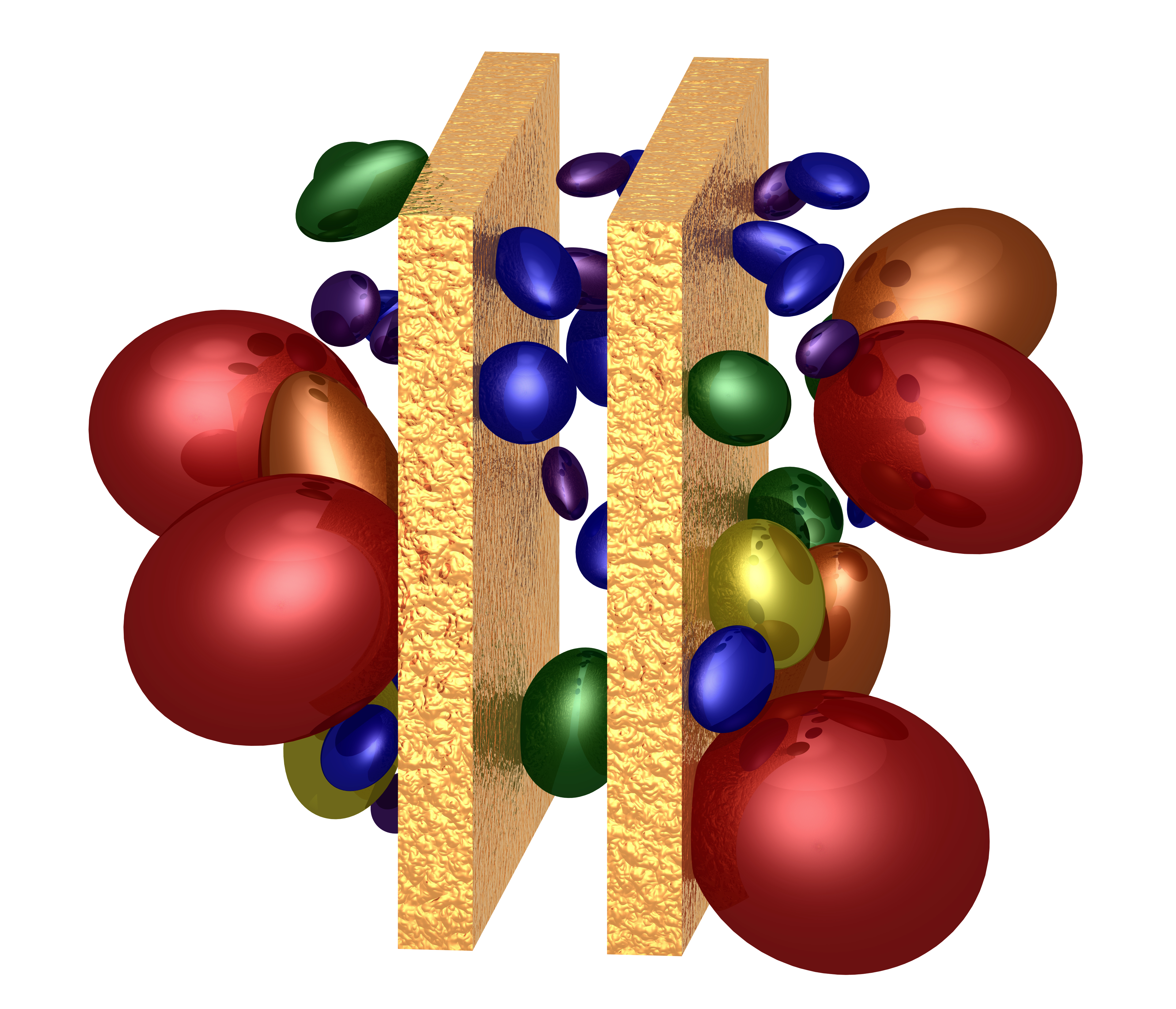
The Casimir effect is a physical force affecting macro-size objects and arises from vacuum energy, which are quantized oscillations in the electromagnetic field permeating every microscopic crevice of the Universe that give that field a non-zero energy. When two conductive flat plates of the same material are less than about 1000 nanometers apart (about twice the width of a common bacterium), they begin to form an electromagnetic cavity that excludes larger-wavelength components of vacuum energy. This reduces the energy between the plates, creating a pressure imbalance that pushes them together. Here, the gap permits only excitations with wavelengths no greater those shown in green color to pop into existence between the plates, excluding yellow, orange, red wavelengths.

Vacuum energy has a number of consequences. In 1948, Dutch physicists Hendrik B. G. Casimir and Dirk Polder predicted the existence of a tiny attractive force between closely placed metal plates due to resonances in the vacuum energy in the space between them. This is now known as the Casimir effect and has since been extensively experimentally verified. It is therefore believed that the vacuum energy is "real" in the same sense that more familiar conceptual objects such as electrons, magnetic fields, etc., are real. However, alternative explanations for the Casimir effect have since been proposed.

Other predictions are harder to verify. Vacuum fluctuations are always created as particle–antiparticle pairs. The creation of these virtual particles near the event horizon of a black hole has been hypothesized by physicist Stephen Hawking to be a mechanism for the eventual "evaporation" of black holes. If one of the pair is pulled into the black hole before this, then the other particle becomes "real" and energy/mass is essentially radiated into space from the black hole. This loss is cumulative and could result in the black hole's disappearance over time. The time required is dependent on the mass of the black hole (the equations indicate that the smaller the black hole, the more rapidly it evaporates) but could be on the order of 10^{60} years for large solar-mass black holes.

The vacuum energy also has important consequences for physical cosmology. General relativity predicts that energy is equivalent to mass, and therefore, if the vacuum energy is "really there", it should exert a gravitational force. Essentially, a non-zero vacuum energy is expected to contribute to the cosmological constant, which affects the expansion of the universe.

== Field strength of vacuum energy ==
The field strength of vacuum energy is a concept proposed in a theoretical study that explores the nature of the vacuum and its relationship to gravitational interactions. The study derived a mathematical framework that uses the field strength of vacuum energy as an indicator of the bulk (spacetime) resistance to localized curvature. It illustrates the association of the field strength of vacuum energy to the curvature of the background, where this concept challenges the traditional understanding of gravity and suggests that the gravitational constant, G, may not be a universal constant, but rather a parameter dependent on the field strength of vacuum energy.

Determination of the value of G has been a topic of extensive research, with numerous experiments conducted over the years in an attempt to measure its precise value. These experiments, often employing high-precision techniques, have aimed to provide accurate measurements of G and establish a consensus on its exact value. However, the outcomes of these experiments have shown significant inconsistencies, making it difficult to reach a definitive conclusion regarding the value of G. This lack of consensus has puzzled scientists and called for alternative explanations.

To test the theoretical predictions regarding the field strength of vacuum energy, specific experimental conditions involving the position of the moon are recommended in the theoretical study. These conditions aim to achieve consistent outcomes in precision measurements of G. The ultimate goal of such experiments is to either falsify or provide confirmations to the proposed theoretical framework. The significance of exploring the field strength of vacuum energy lies in its potential to revolutionize our understanding of gravity and its interactions.

== History ==
In 1934, Georges Lemaître used an unusual perfect-fluid equation of state to interpret the cosmological constant as due to vacuum energy. In 1948, the Casimir effect provided an experimental method for a verification of the existence of vacuum energy; in 1955, however, Evgeny Lifshitz offered a different origin for the Casimir effect. In 1957, Lee and Yang proved the concepts of broken symmetry and parity violation, for which they won the Nobel prize. In 1973, Edward Tryon proposed the zero-energy universe hypothesis: that the Universe may be a large-scale quantum-mechanical vacuum fluctuation where positive mass–energy is balanced by negative gravitational potential energy. During the 1980s, there were many attempts to relate the fields that generate the vacuum energy to specific fields that were predicted by attempts at a Grand Unified Theory and to use observations of the Universe to confirm one or another version. However, the exact nature of the particles (or fields) that generate vacuum energy, with a density such as that required by inflation theory, remains a mystery.

== Vacuum energy in fiction ==
- Arthur C. Clarke's novel The Songs of Distant Earth features a starship powered by a "quantum drive" based on aspects of this theory.
- In the sci-fi television/film franchise Stargate, a Zero Point Module (ZPM) is a power source that extracts zero-point energy from a micro parallel universe.
- The book Star Trek: Deep Space Nine Technical Manual describes the operating principle of the so-called quantum torpedo. In this fictional weapon, an antimatter reaction is used to create a multi-dimensional membrane in a vacuum that releases at its decomposition more energy than was needed to produce it. The missing energy is removed from the vacuum. Usually about twice as much energy is released in the explosion as would correspond to the initial antimatter matter annihilation.
- In the video game Half-Life 2, the item generally known as the "gravity gun" is referred to as both the "zero point field energy manipulator" and the "zero point energy field manipulator."

== See also ==
- Cosmic microwave background
- Dark energy
- False vacuum
- Normal ordering
- Quantum fluctuation
- Sunyaev–Zeldovich effect
- Vacuum state

== External articles and references ==
- Free PDF copy of The Structured Vacuum – thinking about nothing by Johann Rafelski and Berndt Muller (1985); ISBN 3-87144-889-3.
- Saunders, S., & Brown, H. R. (1991). The Philosophy of Vacuum. Oxford [England]: Clarendon Press.
- Poincaré Seminar, Duplantier, B., & Rivasseau, V. (2003). "Poincaré Seminar 2002: vacuum energy-renormalization". Progress in mathematical physics, v. 30. Basel: Birkhäuser Verlag.
- Futamase & Yoshida Possible measurement of vacuum energy.
- Study of Vacuum Energy Physics for Breakthrough Propulsion 2004, NASA Glenn Technical Reports Server (PDF, 57 pages, Retrieved 2013-09-18).
