= Quantum fluctuation =

Random change in the energy inside a volume

3D visualization of quantum fluctuations of the quantum chromodynamics (QCD) vacuum

In quantum physics, a quantum fluctuation (also known as a vacuum state fluctuation or vacuum fluctuation) is the temporary random change in the amount of energy in a point in space, as prescribed by Werner Heisenberg's uncertainty principle. They are minute random fluctuations in the values of the fields which represent elementary particles, such as electric and magnetic fields which represent the electromagnetic force carried by photons, W and Z fields which carry the weak force, and gluon fields which carry the strong force.

The uncertainty principle states the uncertainty in energy and time can be related by $\Delta E \, \Delta t \geq \tfrac{1}{2}\hbar~$, where 1/2ħ ≈ 5.27286×10^{−35} J⋅s. This means that pairs of virtual particles with energy $\Delta E$ and lifetime shorter than $\Delta t$ are continually created and annihilated in empty space. Although the particles are not directly detectable, the cumulative effects of these particles are measurable. For example, without quantum fluctuations, the "bare" mass and charge of elementary particles would be infinite; from renormalization theory the shielding effect of the cloud of virtual particles is responsible for the finite mass and charge of elementary particles.

Another consequence is the Casimir effect. One of the first observations which was evidence for vacuum fluctuations was the Lamb shift in hydrogen. In July 2020, scientists reported that quantum vacuum fluctuations can influence the motion of macroscopic, human-scale objects by measuring correlations below the standard quantum limit between the position/momentum uncertainty of the mirrors of LIGO and the photon number / phase uncertainty of light that they reflect.

== Field fluctuations ==
In quantum field theory, fields undergo quantum fluctuations. A reasonably clear distinction can be made between quantum fluctuations and thermal fluctuations of a quantum field (at least for a free field; for interacting fields, renormalization substantially complicates matters). An illustration of this distinction can be seen by considering relativistic and non-relativistic Klein–Gordon fields: For the relativistic Klein–Gordon field in the vacuum state, we can calculate the propagator that we would observe a configuration $\varphi_t(x)$ at a time t in terms of its Fourier transform $\tilde\varphi_t(k)$ to be

$$\rho_0[\varphi_t] = \exp{\left[-\frac{it}{\hbar}
\int\frac{d^3k}{(2\pi)^3}
\tilde\varphi_t^*(k)\sqrt{|k|^2+m^2}\,\tilde\varphi_t(k)\right]}.$$

In contrast, for the non-relativistic Klein–Gordon field at non-zero temperature, the Gibbs probability density that we would observe a configuration $\varphi_t(x)$ at a time $t$ is

$$\rho_E[\varphi_t] = \exp\big[-H[\varphi_t]/k_\text{B}T\big] = \exp{\left[-\frac{1}{k_\text{B}T} \int\frac{d^3k}{(2\pi)^3}
\tilde\varphi_t^*(k) \frac{1}{2}\left(|k|^2 + m^2\right)\,\tilde\varphi_t(k)\right]}.$$

These probability distributions illustrate that every possible configuration of the field is possible, with the amplitude of quantum fluctuations controlled by the Planck constant $\hbar$, just as the amplitude of thermal fluctuations is controlled by $k_\text{B}T$, where k_{B} is the Boltzmann constant. Note that the following three points are closely related:

1. the Planck constant has units of action (joule-seconds) instead of units of energy (joules),
2. the quantum kernel is $\sqrt{|k|^2 + m^2}$ instead of $\tfrac{1}{2} \big(|k|^2 + m^2\big)$ (the relativistic quantum kernel is nonlocal differently from the non-relativistic classical heat kernel, but it is causal),
3. the quantum vacuum state is Lorentz-invariant (although not manifestly in the above), whereas the classical thermal state is not (both the non-relativistic dynamics and the Gibbs probability density initial condition are not Lorentz-invariant).

A classical continuous random field can be constructed that has the same probability density as the quantum vacuum state, so that the principal difference from quantum field theory is the measurement theory (measurement in quantum theory is different from measurement for a classical continuous random field, in that classical measurements are always mutually compatible – in quantum-mechanical terms they always commute).

== Quantum fluctuations as loop effects ==
Tree-level electron propagator

In the language of Feynman diagrams, quantum fluctuations enter at the level of loop diagrams. In quantum electrodynamics, for example, the electron self energy diagram (to the right, below) would constitute quantum fluctuations in relation to the electron propagator (to the right, above).

Loop correction to electron propagator; referred to as "electron self-energy"

These loop diagrams are initially problematic; they introduce an integral over the loop momentum (in this case $k$) from $-\infty$ to $\infty$, allowing contributions from arbitrarily large momenta. In the case of the electron self energy, the integral is logarithmically divergent and leads to an infinite amplitude. This problem is addressed by renormalizing the theory, which corresponds to absorbing the infinity into the mass parameter in the case of the electron self energy. In this example, we write the amplitude of the self energy diagram as $\textstyle P_{e}(p)(-i \Sigma_2(\cancel{p}))P_{e}(p)$, where $\textstyle P_e(p) = \frac{i}{\cancel{p}-m_0}$ is the electron propagator and $-i\Sigma_2(\cancel{p})$ represents the loop component. By generalizing the loop to a one particle irreducible (1PI) diagram $-i \Sigma(\cancel{p})$, we can write the full propagator as a sum of 1PI diagrams:

$$\begin{aligned}
&\textstyle\frac{i}{\cancel{p}-m_0} + \frac{i}{\cancel{p}-m_0} (-i\Sigma) \frac{i}{\cancel{p}-m_0} + \frac{i}{\cancel{p}-m_0}(-i \Sigma) \frac{i}{\cancel{p}-m_0} (-i \Sigma) \frac{i}{\cancel{p}-m_0} + \cdots
\\=&\textstyle \frac{i}{\cancel{p}-m_0} + \frac{i}{\cancel{p}-m_0} \left(\frac{\Sigma}{\cancel{p}-m_0}\right) + \frac{i}{\cancel{p}-m_0} \left(\frac{\Sigma}{\cancel{p}-m_0}\right)^2 + \cdots
\end{aligned}$$

This is just a geometric series, $\textstyle \sum a r^n$; the solution is $a/(1-r)$, or
$$\frac{i}{\cancel{p} - m_0 - \Sigma}$$
This is the step in which the infinity ($\Sigma$) is absorbed into the mass parameter: $m_0$ is in fact not the observable mass, but simply the mass parameter in the QED Lagrangian; the observable (or "physical") mass is defined as the pole mass (the mass at which the propagator has a pole), which in this case is $m \equiv m_0 + \Sigma$. We know that $\Sigma$ is infinite (recall, we said it was logarithmically divergent), and $m_0$ is unobservable -- this allows us to conclude that $m_0$ is itself must be infinite so that the sum $m_0 + \Sigma$ is regular.

== Quantum fluctuations and effective field theories ==
The goal of an effective field theory is to describe the effects of high-energy physics at low energies. Quantum (field) fluctuations play a crucial role in formulating the effective action $S_\text{eff}=\int d^Dx\ \mathcal{L}_\text{eff}$, which addresses this goal exactly. Specifically, the frequently-used derivative expansion involves splitting a quantum field $\phi (x)$ into a classical background field $\phi_\text{cl}(x)$ and a quantum field encompassing high-energy fluctuations, $\omega(x)$, as in $\phi(x) = \phi_\text{cl}(x) + \omega(x)$.

A central idea in the study of effective field theories involves the fact that the generating functional $Z[J]$ -- an abstract quantity which produces correlation functions via the relationship $\langle \phi(x_1) \cdots \phi(x_n) \rangle = \frac{1}{Z[0]} \left(-i \frac{\delta}{\delta J(x_1)}\right)\cdots \left(-i \frac{\delta}{\delta J(x_n)}\right) Z[J]\bigg|_{J=0}$ -- includes an integral over field configurations, $Z[J]= \int \mathcal{D}\phi\ \exp\left(i S + i\int d^Dx\ \phi(x) J(x)\right)$. If our goal is to describe high-energy physics at low energies, we can split $\phi(x) = \phi_\text{cl}(x) + \omega(x)$ as prescribed before and simply integrate out the $\omega(x)$ fields. The result of this integration allows us to obtain the effective Lagrangian, $\textstyle \mathcal{L}_\text{eff} = \mathcal{L}_0 + (\text{sum of connected Feynman diagrams})$, with $\mathcal{L}_0$ being the expression for the original Lagrangian. The term $\textstyle(\text{sum of connected Feynman diagrams})$ precisely accounts for the effects of high-energy fluctuations at low energies.

== See also ==
- Cosmic microwave background
- False vacuum
- Hawking radiation
- Quantum annealing
- Quantum foam
- Stochastic quantum mechanics
- Vacuum energy
- Vacuum polarization
- Virtual black hole
- Zitterbewegung
