= Minić =

Minić (Serbian: Минић) is a surname. It may refer to:

- Djordje Minic (born 1964), American physicist
- Dragoljub Minić (1937–2005), Yugoslav chess Grandmaster
- Miloš Minić (1914–2003), Serbian Communist politician
- Serafin Rafael Minić (1808–1883), Croatian-Italian mathematician
