= Not even wrong (disambiguation) =

Not even wrong is a phrase in reference to arguments and theories that cannot be scientifically verified or used for scientific predictions.

Not Even Wrong may also refer to:

- Not Even Wrong, a weblog and 2006 book by Peter Woit
- Not Even Wrong: Adventures in Autism, a 2004 book by Paul Collins
- Not Even Wrong: Margaret Mead, Derek Freeman, and the Samoans, a 1996 book about Margaret Mead by Martin Orans
