= The Singular Universe and the Reality of Time =

Book by Lee Smolin and Roberto Mangabeira

- Cover of the hardcover edition
- Authors: Lee Smolin; Roberto Mangabeira Unger
- Language: English
- Subjects: Physics, cosmology, philosophy of time
- Publisher: Cambridge University Press
- Publication date: December 8, 2014
- Publication place: United States
- Media type: Print
- Pages: 566 pp.
- ISBN: 978-1107074064
- Preceded by: Time Reborn (by Smolin); The Religion of the Future (by Unger)
- Followed by: Einstein’s Unfinished Revolution (by Smolin); The Knowledge Economy (by Unger)

The Singular Universe and the Reality of Time: A Proposal in Natural Philosophy is a book about cosmology, philosophy of time, metaphysics and scientific naturalism by the American theoretical physicist Lee Smolin and the Brazilian philosopher Roberto Mangabeira Unger. The authors argue that the current crisis in cosmology is a result of physicists making the wrong commitments to universalizing local experiments and to a block universe. They suggest instead that new research projects would be revealed if we took seriously the idea of one, and only one, universe as well as the reality of our experience of time. This new paradigm, they say, would also give rise to the revolutionary notion that the laws of nature might not be immutable. The book was initially published by Cambridge University Press on December 8, 2014.

== Synopsis ==
The book discusses a number of philosophical and physical ideas on the true role of time in the Universe. The text is roughly divided into two halves, the first one written by Unger, and the second by Smolin, both developing the same themes in different ways, with Smolin being more focused on the physics.

== Reviews ==
You might expect a book co-authored by Smolin and Unger to be an exchange about science and human values—something, perhaps, in the region of the 1930 dialogue between Einstein and the polymath Rabindranath Tagore. But The Singular Universe and the Reality of Time is not that kind of thing: it is a big and daunting book, harder to read than recent works by either author. The first section, by Unger, includes among other things an exploration of the global, irreversible and continuous attributes of time, followed by an analysis of proto-ontological assumptions. The second section, by Smolin, contains an approach to solving the meta-law dilemma, outlining linear cyclic models, branching models and branching cyclic cosmologies before it dives into cosmological natural selection, pluralistic cosmological scenarios and the principle of precedence.

—The Guardian

I found the long section by Unger rather hard going and not very rewarding... Smolin gives a discussion of mathematics itself which I think few mathematicians would recognize

—Peter Woit

== See also ==
- Philosophy of time
