= Ruth Ashery-Padan =

Israeli Geneticist

Ruth Ashery-Padan (Hebrew: רות אשרי-פדן) is an Israeli geneticist who is a professor and principal investigator in the Department of Human Genetics and Molecular Medicine at the Sackler Faculty of Medicine, Tel Aviv University. She is known for her contributions to the understanding of ocular development.

== Life and education ==
Ruth Ashery-Padan was born in Israel. She earned her bachelor's in biology and psychology in 1988 and a master's degree in genetics in 1990, both from the Hebrew University of Jerusalem. In 1996, she graduated with her Ph.D. in genetics from the Hebrew University of Jerusalem, where she became interested in the molecular mechanisms of eye development. From 1996-2001, Ashery-Padan was a postdoctoral research fellow at the laboratory of Peter Gruss in the Department of Molecular Cell Biology at the Max Planck Institute for Biophysical Chemistry.

Ashery-Padan served as the Head of the Yoran Institute for Human Genome Research. She is also on the organizing board of the Israel Society of Developmental Biology and a member of Tel Aviv University's School of Neuroscience.

== Career and research ==
Ashery-Padan's research interests and contributions are focused on various aspects of ocular development and molecular biology, including lenses, transcription factors, retinal pigmented epithelium, neurogenesis, morphogenesis, stem cells, and cell fate decisions during early retinal development. Ashery-Padan has collaborated extensively with researchers from various institutions across the United States and internationally. She has authored or co-authored over 139 publications, which have received over 7,055 citations.

In 2001, Ashery-Padan joined the faculty of Tel Aviv University to establish her laboratory which focuses on solving the complexities of ocular development. Her research has advanced the scientific field's understanding of the roles of transcription factors, particularly Pax6, in eye formation. Ashery-Padan employs functional studies in vivo combined with gene arrays, biochemical, and cell culture studies to investigate transcription factor activity on target genes. Her research team has revealed the roles of Pax6 in progenitor cells of the retina, lens, iris, and ciliary body. According to the E. Matilda Ziegler Foundation for the Blind, genetic dissection of Pax6 dosage requirements in the developing eye has shown that Pax6 dosage in the lens and cornea affects the development of the eye's drainage structures and leads to ganglion cell loss.

Ashery-Padan also studied Age-Related Macular Degeneration (AMD). As published in PLOS Biology, she had the main goal of finding the genetic intricacies underlying Age-Related Macular Degeneration by focusing on the retinal pigmented epithelium (RPE), a tissue particularly impacted in the early stages of the disease. Within this context, she found two pivotal proteins, LHX2 and OTX2, as key transcriptional activators that control the expression of numerous genes exclusive to RPE tissue. By employing the ChIP-seq method, Ashery-Padan and her team were able to precisely map the genomic regions where these proteins bind. They revealed their critical function in regulating gene expression. Changes in DNA sequences in these genomic regions were shown to affect the expression of nearby genes, one of which encodes an ion channel essential for proper operation of the eyes, increasing the risk of AMD.

== Awards and honors ==
- Dan David Prize for Young Investigators (2002)
- Teva Prize:
- E. Matilda Ziegler Foundation for the Blind Award: H
- Alon Fellowship (VATAT):

== Publications ==
- Ashery-Padan, Ruth, et al. "Editorial: With the eyes on non-coding RNAS." Frontiers in Cell and Developmental Biology, vol. 9, 29 July 2021, https://doi.org/10.3389/fcell.2021.737703.
- Ashery-Padan, Ruth, et al. "The LHX2-otx2 transcriptional regulatory module controls retinal pigmented epithelium differentiation and underlies genetic risk for age-related macular degeneration." PLOS Biology, vol. 21, no. 1, 17 Jan. 2023, https://doi.org/10.1371/journal.pbio.3001924.
- Ashery-Padan, Ruth, et al. "Cell fate decisions, transcription factors and signaling during early retinal development." Progress in Retinal and Eye Research, vol. 91, Nov. 2022, p. 101093, https://doi.org/10.1016/j.preteyeres.2022.101093.
- Ashery-Padan, Ruth, et al. "Retinal pigmented epithelium development from the perspective of transcription factors and cis‐regulatory elements." Acta Ophthalmologica, vol. 100, no. S275, Dec. 2022, https://doi.org/10.1111/j.1755-3768.2022.15476.
- Ashery-Padan, Ruth, et al. "Pathophysiology of aniridia-associated keratopathy: Developmental Aspects and Unanswered Questions." The Ocular Surface, vol. 22, Oct. 2021, pp. 245–266, https://doi.org/10.1016/j.jtos.2021.09.001.
- Ashery-Padan, Ruth, et al. "Zeb2 regulates the balance between retinal interneurons and Müller glia by inhibition of BMP–smad signaling." Developmental Biology, vol. 468, no. 1–2, Dec. 2020, pp. 80–92, https://doi.org/10.1016/j.ydbio.2020.09.006.
- Ashery-Padan, Ruth, et al. "SWI/SNF complexes are required for retinal pigmented epithelium differentiation and for the inhibition of cell proliferation and neural differentiation programs." Development, vol. 150, no. 16, 15 Aug. 2023, https://doi.org/10.1242/dev.201488.
- Ashery-Padan, Ruth, et al. "Notch signaling controls ciliary body morphogenesis and secretion by directly regulating nectin protein expression." Cell Reports, vol. 34, no. 2, Jan. 2021, p. 108603, https://doi.org/10.1016/j.celrep.2020.108603.
- Ashery-Padan, Ruth, et al. "Recycled melanoma-secreted melanosomes regulate tumor-associated macrophage diversification." The EMBO Journal, 8 May 2024, https://doi.org/10.1038/s44318-024-00103-7.
