= Laurent Freidel =

French physicist

- Born: Laurent Freidel; France
- Education: École normale supérieure de Lyon
- Known for: Loop quantum gravity and Spin Foam models of quantum gravity, specifically the Freidel-Krasnov spin foam model
- Scientific career
- Workplaces: Perimeter Institute for Theoretical Physics
- Thesis: (1994)

Laurent Freidel is a French theoretical physicist and mathematical physicist known mainly for his contributions to quantum gravity, including loop quantum gravity, spin foam models, doubly special relativity, group field theory, relative locality and most recently metastring theory. He is currently a faculty member at Perimeter Institute for Theoretical Physics in Waterloo, Ontario, Canada.

Freidel received his PhD in 1994 from the École normale supérieure de Lyon (ENSL) in Lyon, France. He stayed at ENSL officially as a research scientist for 12 years, until 2006. During that time he also held a postdoctoral position at Pennsylvania State University in State College, Pennsylvania, United States from 1997 to 1999 and an adjunct professor position at the University of Waterloo in Waterloo, Ontario, Canada from 2002 to 2009. In 2006 he joined Perimeter Institute as its ninth faculty member.

Between 2004 and 2006 Freidel has coauthored a series of papers on the Ponzano-Regge model, a spin foam model of 3-dimensional quantum gravity. In 2007 he introduced, with Kirill Krasnov, a new spin foam model for 4-dimensional quantum gravity which has become known as the Freidel-Krasnov model.

In 2011 Freidel published a paper with Giovanni Amelino-Camelia, Jerzy Kowalski-Glikman and Lee Smolin introducing the principle of relative locality, a proposed generalization of the principle of relativity in which different observers see different notions of spacetimes. Between 2013 and 2015 he published a series of papers with Robert Leigh and Djordje Minic introducing a new formulation of string theory, metastring theory, which implements the notion of relative locality in a precise way and introduces a new notion of modular spacetime.
