= KKLT =

KKLT may refer to:

- KKLT (FM), a K-Love radio station established in Arkansas in 2005
- KKLT mechanism, a construction in string theory
