= Nick Beal (disambiguation) =

Nick or Nicholas Beal(e) may refer to:

- Nick Beal (born 1970), English rugby player
- Nick Beal, main character in film Alias Nick Beal
- Nicholas Beale, co-author of the book Questions of Truth
