= Sandip Trivedi =

Indian theoretical physicist

- Born: 5 April 1963 (age 63); India
- Education: Indian Institute of Technology Kanpur; California Institute of Technology; Institute for Advanced Study
- Known for: KKLT mechanism
- Spouse: Shubha Tole
- Awards: 2018 H. K. Firodia Award; 2015 TWAS Prize; 2010 Infosys Prize; 2005 Shanti Swarup Bhatnagar Award
- Scientific career
- Fields: Theoretical physics
- Workplaces: TIFR
- Doctoral advisor: John Preskill

Sandip Trivedi (Hindi: सन्दिप त्रिवेदी; born 1963) is an Indian theoretical physicist working at Tata Institute for Fundamental Research (TIFR) at Mumbai, India, where had been the director. He is well known for his contributions to string theory, in particular finding (along with Renata Kallosh, Andrei Linde, and Shamit Kachru) the first models of accelerated expansion of the universe in low energy supersymmetric string (see KKLT mechanism). His research areas include string theory, cosmology and particle physics. He is now member of program advisory board of International Center for Theoretical Sciences (ICTS). He is also the recipient of the Infosys Prize 2010 in the category of Physical Sciences.

== Education ==
He completed his master of science (Integrated) in physics from IIT Kanpur in 1985. He was awarded his PhD in 1990 from Caltech, Pasadena, USA. Later he went on to work as a post-doctoral research associate at IAS, Princeton until 1992.

== Awards ==
He won the prestigious Shanti Swarup Bhatnagar Award in the Physical Sciences in 2005. He was the recipient of the Infosys Prize 2010 in the category of Physical Sciences. He is also a recipient of the TWAS Prize in Physics in 2015.
