= Shubha Tole =

Indian neuroscientist

- Shubha Tole presenting "Our flexible brains" at a TED talk March 30, 2019
- Born: August 1967 (age 59)
- Education: St Xavier's, Mumbai California Institute of Technology, USA
- Occupation: Neuroscientist
- Employer: Tata Institute of Fundamental Research
- Spouse: Sandip Trivedi
- Children: 2

Shubha Tole' (born August 1967) is an Indian neuroscientist, professor and principal Investigator at the Tata Institute of Fundamental Research in Mumbai, India. Her research investigates the development and evolution of the mammalian brain. In 2014, she won the Infosys Prize in the Life Sciences category.

== Early life and education ==
Tole was born in August 1967 in India. Her mother, Aruna P. Tole, was an occupational therapist responsible for the design of prostheses, aids, and appliances for cancer patients. Her father was the director of SAMEER, an institute under the Department of Electronics, Government of India, in August 1967.

Tole studied life sciences and biochemistry at St. Xavier’s College in Mumbai and earned her master's and doctoral degrees at the California Institute of Technology in the United States. Tole conducted post-doctoral research at the University of Chicago.

== Research and career ==
In 1999, Dr. Tole started her research group at the Tata Institute of Fundamental Research, Mumbai.

Dr. Tole and her research group is credited with the discovery of the role of the regulatory gene LHX2, which controls aspects of how the amygdala, cortex, and hippocampus form during early brain development. Dr. Tole's research group also proposed a possible mechanism for how the neocortex may have come to be in mammals, linking it to a much older structure of the brain, the amygdala. Her research group also discovered dual developmental origins for structures that control reproductive and aggressive behavior in the accessory olfactory bulb in mammals.

Tole has also held a membership with academic groups such as the International Affairs Committee of the American Society for Cell Biology. She is also a Fellow of the National Academy of Sciences, India and the Indian Academy of Sciences.

== Personal life ==
Dr. Tole is married to theoretical physicist Sandip Trivedi since 1989. They have two sons.

== Honors and awards ==
Tole has received the Wellcome Trust Senior International Fellowship (1999), the Swarnajayanti Fellowship from the Department of Science and Technology of the Government of India (2005), the National Woman Bioscientist award from the Department of Biotechnology of Government of India (2008), the Research Award for Innovation in Neurosciences (RAIN award) from the Society for Neuroscience, United States (2008), and the Shanti Swarup Bhatnagar Award (2010). She was also awarded the Wellcome Trust Flexible Travel Award grant by Stanford University for a Sabbatical year in 2008. In 2014, Tole was awarded the Infosys Prize of 55 lakh rupees for her work elucidating the mechanisms and genes involved in the formation of the hippocampus. In 2016, she became a laureate of the Asian Scientist 100 by the Asian Scientist.

== Publications ==
- LHX2 Interacts with the NuRD Complex and Regulates Cortical Neuron Subtype Determinants Fezf2 and Sox11
- Dmrt5, a Novel Neurogenic Factor, Reciprocally Regulates Lhx2 to Control the Neuron-Glia Cell-Fate Switch in the Developing Hippocampus
- Novel functions of LHX2 and PAX6 in the developing telencephalon revealed upon combined loss of both genes.
