= Cosmological natural selection =

Scientific hypothesis

Cosmological natural selection, also called the fecund universes, is a hypothesis proposed by Lee Smolin intended as a scientific alternative to the anthropic principle. It addresses why the universe has the particular properties that allow for complexity and life. The hypothesis suggests that a process analogous to biological natural selection applies at the grandest of scales. Smolin first proposed the idea in 1992 and summarized it in a book aimed at a lay audience called The Life of the Cosmos, published in 1997.

== Hypothesis ==
Black holes have a role in natural selection. In the fecund theory, the formation of a black hole causes the emergence of a new universe on the "other side", whose fundamental constant parameters (masses of elementary particles, Planck constant, elementary charge, and so forth) may differ slightly from those of the universe where the black hole collapsed. Each universe thus gives rise to as many new universes as it has black holes. The theory contains the evolutionary ideas of "reproduction" and "mutation" of universes, and so is formally analogous to models of population biology

Alternatively, black holes play a role in cosmological natural selection by reshuffling only some matter, affecting the distribution of elementary quark universes. The resulting population of universes can be represented as a distribution of a landscape of parameters where the height of the landscape is proportional to the number of black holes that a universe with those parameters will have. Applying reasoning borrowed from the study of fitness landscapes in population biology, one can conclude that the population is dominated by universes whose parameters drive the production of black holes to a local peak in the landscape. This was the first use of the notion of a landscape of parameters in physics.

== Criticism ==
Leonard Susskind, who later promoted a similar string theory landscape, stated:

I'm not sure why Smolin's idea didn't attract much attention. I actually think it deserved far more than it got.

However, Susskind also argued that, since Smolin's theory relies on information transfer from the parent universe to the baby universe through a black hole, it ultimately makes no sense as a theory of cosmological natural selection. According to Susskind and many other physicists, the last decade of black hole physics has shown us that no information that goes into a black hole can be lost. Even Stephen Hawking, who was the largest proponent of the idea that information is lost in a black hole, later reversed his position. The implication is that information transfer from the parent universe into the baby universe through a black hole is not conceivable.

In a critical review of The Life of the Cosmos, astrophysicist Joe Silk suggested that our universe falls short by about four orders of magnitude from being maximal for the production of black holes. In his book Questions of Truth, particle physicist John Polkinghorne puts forward another difficulty with Smolin's thesis: one cannot impose the consistent multiversal time required to make the evolutionary dynamics work, since short-lived universes with few descendants would then dominate long-lived universes with many descendants.

When Smolin published the theory in 1992, he proposed as a prediction of his theory that no neutron star should exist with a solar mass bigger than 1.6. Later, this figure was raised to 2.0 solar masses following more precise modeling of neutron star interiors by nuclear astrophysicists. If a more massive neutron star was ever observed, it would show that our universe's natural laws were not tuned for maximal black hole production, because the mass of the strange quark could be retuned to lower the mass threshold for production of a black hole. A 1.97-solar-mass pulsar was discovered in 2010. In 2019, neutron star PSR J0740+6620 was discovered with a solar mass of 2.08 ± 0.07. In 2022, this record was overtaken by PSR J0952−0607 with a solar mass of 2.35 ± 0.17.

== See also ==
- Anthropic principle
- Biocosm
- Black hole cosmology
- General relativity
- Quantum gravity
- Quantum mechanics
