= Time Reborn =

Book by Lee Smolin

- Hardcover edition
- Author: Lee Smolin
- Language: English
- Subject: Physics
- Publisher: Houghton Mifflin Harcourt
- Publication date: April 23, 2013
- Publication place: United States
- Media type: Print
- Pages: 352 pp
- ISBN: 978-0547511726
- Preceded by: The Trouble with Physics (2006)
- Followed by: The Singular Universe and the Reality of Time (2014)

Time Reborn: From the Crisis in Physics to the Future of the Universe is a 2013 book by the American theoretical physicist Lee Smolin.

Smolin argues for what he calls a revolutionary view that time is real, in contrast to existing scientific orthodoxy which holds that time is merely a "stubbornly persistent illusion" (Einstein's words). Smolin hypothesizes that the very laws of physics are not fixed, but that they actually evolve over time.

== Content and concepts ==
Time Reborn is divided into two parts: Part I describes established physics and its history from the time of Plato and the main established ideas, Newtonian physics (and Leibniz' philosophical views that countered Newton's e.g. on background dependent physics and his religious justification), Albert Einstein's special and general relativity, and quantum mechanics. Part II describes Smolin's views (his "future" for physics, relying on his and ideas of others) on why these all are slightly wrong, that is, the need to reestablish time as fundamental (and probably space as non-fundamental, rather than vice versa, that was Einstein's view) through e.g. one idea, shape dynamics, a duality of Einstein's general relativity, that does that.

Smolin argues for what he calls a revolutionary view that time is real, in contrast to existing scientific orthodoxy which holds that time is merely a "stubbornly persistent illusion" (Einstein's words). Smolin reasons that physicists have improperly rejected the reality of time because they confuse their mathematical models—which are timeless but deal in abstractions that do not exist—with reality. Smolin hypothesizes instead that the very laws of physics are not fixed, but that they actually evolve over time.

Smolin asserts that overturning the existing orthodoxy is the best hope for finding solutions to contemporary physics problems, such as bringing gravity into line with the rest of the currently accepted models, the nature of the quantum world and its unification with spacetime and cosmology. Outside science, Smolin asserts his views have important implications for human agency, and on how our social, political, economic and environmental decisions affect our future, Smolin saying that contrary to deterministic philosophies derived from conventional physics, humans do have the power to exert control over climate change, our economic system and our technology.

The book's topic was the subject of the author's 2013 presentation at the Royal Society of Arts.

== Reception ==
Through his brilliant writing [in The Trouble with Physics] and articulate arguments, readers took him seriously. One string theorist told me that he struggled to convince nonphysicists that he wasn’t a charlatan after the publication of Smolin’s book. Now, in Time Reborn, Smolin attempts to chip away at basic theories of modern physics. He makes the case that by doing away with time, existing theories are missing a trick [...]

According to Smolin, our picture of a timeless Universe stems from the assumption that all modern physics — quantum as well as classical — is predictive. How a system evolves is entirely encoded in the starting set of ‘initial conditions’ and their transformation according to the laws of physics. Evolution in time is secondary, a by-product of the theory. This bothers Smolin. A timeless view of reality is, he says repeatedly, incomplete (where do the initial conditions or laws come from?) and, simply, “wrong”. He believes that a better description of time lies at the heart of some of the big questions, such as the marriage of quantum physics and general relativity.

Smolin sketches an alternative path for modern physics. Inspired by the ideas of Brazilian philosopher and political theorist, Roberto Mangabeira Unger, who argues that social structures emerge without an underlying natural order or guiding principle, Smolin develops some of the ideas behind his first book, The Life of the Cosmos.

— Pedro Ferreira, professor of astrophysics at the University of Oxford, UK, review of the book in Nature journal.

The New York Times' James Gleick wrote that Smolin's arguments from science and history were "as provocative, original, and unsettling as any I’ve read in years," contradicting the commonly accepted views of H.G. Wells, Hermann Minkowski, Albert Einstein, Isaac Newton and Plato; Gleick predicted it will ring false to many contemporaries in theoretical physics. Gleick further wrote that Smolin has a "fairly puritanical view of what science should and should not do"—disfavoring multiverses or other non-testable concepts or quests for timeless truths, but allowing that science creates “effective theories” even though they are incomplete, of limited domains, and approximate.

Kirkus Reviews described the book, which omits mathematical explanations, as being as much philosophy as science, and as providing "a flood of ideas from an imaginative thinker." For the Institute for Ethics and Emerging Technologies, author Rick Searle wrote that Time Reborn is "just as much a diagnosis of contemporary economic and political ills" as it is a book about physics. Possible economic and political similarities/"implication" (to physics and philosophy discussed in the book) are only mentioned in the preface and epilogue of the book.
