= The Trouble with Physics =

2006 string theory book by Lee Smolin

The Trouble with Physics: The Rise of String Theory, the Fall of a Science, and What Comes Next
- Cover of the hardcover edition
- Author: Lee Smolin
- Language: English
- Subject: Science
- Publisher: Houghton Mifflin Harcourt
- Publication date: September 19, 2006
- Publication place: United States
- Media type: Print
- Pages: 416 pp
- ISBN: 978-0-618-55105-7
- OCLC: 64453453
- Dewey Decimal: 530.14 22
- LC Class: QC6 .S6535 2006
- Preceded by: Three Roads to Quantum Gravity (2001)
- Followed by: Time Reborn (2013)

The Trouble with Physics: The Rise of String Theory, the Fall of a Science, and What Comes Next is a 2006 book by the theoretical physicist Lee Smolin about the problems with string theory. The book strongly criticizes string theory and its prominence in contemporary theoretical physics, on the grounds that string theory has yet to come up with a single prediction that can be verified using any technology that is likely to be feasible within our lifetimes. Smolin also focuses on the difficulties faced by research in quantum gravity, and by current efforts to come up with a theory explaining all four fundamental interactions. The book is broadly concerned with the role of controversy and diversity of approaches in scientific processes and ethics.

Smolin suggests both that there appear to be serious deficiencies in string theory and that string theory has an unhealthy near-monopoly on fundamental physics in the United States, and that a diversity of approaches is needed. He argues that more attention should instead be paid to background independent theories of quantum gravity.

In the book, Smolin claims that string theory makes no new testable predictions; that it has no coherent mathematical formulation; and that it has not been mathematically proved finite. Some experts in the theoretical physics community disagree with these statements.

Smolin states that to propose a string theory landscape having up to 10^{500} string vacuum solutions is tantamount to abandoning accepted science:

The scenario of many unobserved universes plays the same logical role as the scenario of an intelligent designer. Each provides an untestable hypothesis that, if true, makes something improbable seem quite probable.

== Reviews ==
The book generated much controversy and debate about the merits of string theory, and was criticised by some prominent physicists including Sean Carroll and string theorists Joseph Polchinski and Luboš Motl.

Polchinski's review states, "In the end, these [Smolin and others'] books fail to capture much of the spirit and logic of string theory."

Motl's review goes on to say "the concentration of irrational statements and anti-scientific sentiments has exceeded my expectations," and,

In the context of string theory, he literally floods the pages of his book with undefendable speculations about some basic results of string theory. Because these statements are of mathematical nature, we are sure that Lee is wrong even in the absence of any experiments.

Sean Carroll's review expressed frustration because in his opinion, "The Trouble with Physics is really two books, with intertwined but ultimately independent arguments." He suggested that the arguments in the book appear divided:

"[one argument is] big and abstract and likely to be ignored by most of the book's audience; the other is narrow and specific and part of a wide-ranging and heated discussion carried out between scientists, in the popular press, and on the internet."

Furthermore,

The abstract argument — about academic culture and the need to nurture speculative ideas — is, in my opinion, important and largely correct, while the specific one — about the best way to set about quantizing gravity — is overstated and undersupported.

Carroll fears that excessive attention paid to the specific dispute is likely to disadvantage the more general abstract argument.

Sabine Hossenfelder, in a review written a year later and titled "The Trouble With Physics: Aftermath" alludes to the book's polarising effect on the scientific community. She explores the author's views as a contrast in generations, while supporting his right to them. Hossenfelder believes that Smolin's book attempts to restore the relation physics once had with philosophy, quoting him as follows:

Philosophy used to be part of the natural sciences – for a long time. For long centuries during which our understanding of the world we live in has progressed tremendously. There is no doubt that times change, but not all changes are a priori good if left without further consideration. Here, change has resulted in a gap between the natural sciences where questioning the basis of our theories, and an embedding into the historical and sociological context used to be. Even though many new specifically designed interdisciplinary fields have been established, investigating the foundations of our current theories has basically been erased out of curricula and textbooks.

== The String Wars ==
A discussion in 2006 took place between UCSB physicists at KITP and science journalist George Johnson regarding the controversy caused by the books of Smolin (The Trouble with Physics) and Peter Woit (Not Even Wrong). The meeting was titled "The String Wars" to reflect the impression the media has given people regarding the controversy in string theory caused by Smolin's and Woit's books. A video of the proceedings is available at UCSB's website.

== See also ==
- Loop quantum gravity
- Peter Woit
