= David Fairlie =

British mathematician and theoretical physicist

David B. Fairlie (born in South Queensferry, Scotland, 1935) is a British mathematician and theoretical physicist, Professor Emeritus at the University of Durham (UK).

He was educated in mathematical physics at the University of Edinburgh (BSc 1957), and he earned a PhD at the University of Cambridge in 1960, under the supervision of John Polkinghorne. After postdoctoral training at Princeton University and Cambridge, he was lecturer in St. Andrews (1962–64) and at Durham University (1964), retiring as Professor (2000).

He has made numerous influential contributions in particle and mathematical physics, notably in the early formulation of string theory, as well as the determination of the weak mixing angle in extra dimensions, infinite-dimensional Lie algebras, classical solutions of gauge theories, higher-dimensional gauge theories, and deformation quantization.

He has co-authored several volumes, notably on quantum mechanics in phase space.
