= Faith, Science and Understanding =

2000 book by John Polkinghorne

- Author: John Polkinghorne
- Language: English
- Genre: Non-fiction
- Publisher: Yale University Press
- Publication date: 2000
- Publication place: United States
- ISBN: 0-300-08372-6

Faith, Science, and Understanding is a book by John Polkinghorne which explores aspects of the integration between science and theology. It is based on lectures he gave at the University of Nottingham and Yale and on some other papers.

== Publication information ==
It was published in 2000 by Yale University Press and issued in paperback in 2001. There are 17 citations in Google Scholar

== Synopsis ==
In 1. Theology in the University Polkinghorne suggests that "the essential purpose of a University is the discovery and propagation of knowledge"(p4) and that universities are institutionalised expressions of the beliefs in the value of knowledge for knowledge's sake and the essential unity of all knowledge. He says that quantum theory illustrates the principle "Do not make common sense the measure of everything but be prepared to recognise aspects of reality in those modes that are intrinsic to their natures, however strange these modes may at first sight be."(p7). He argues that personal experience is a fundamental aspect of reality and that the human intuition of an infinite Reality is another fact about humanity and that one of the roles of theology is the intellectual study of the religious dimension of personal experience (p19), whilst theological metaphysics can offer a more profound understanding of reality (p22)

In 2. Motivations for Belief he rejects simplistic accounts of science, commending instead the approach of Michael Polanyi. He points out that the laws of nature operate all the time, but that understanding is only possible if we have access to regimes that are particularly transparent to our enquiry (p36) and suggests that God is always there, but there have been particular moments in history that have been unusually open to the divine presence, and that Scripture is evidence, the record of foundational spiritual experience (p37). He expounds the doctrine of the Trinity and commends John Zizioulas's Being as Communion.

In 3. The Role of Revelation he suggests that "revelation bears an analogy with the role played by observations and experiment in science" and that the pursuit of simplicity through studying extreme conditions (such as Deep inelastic scattering) is an important part of science. He also suggests that the fact that the Bible is still read with attention and spiritual profit by so many people so long after it was written is a fact that should be taken into account. (p56)

In 4. Design in Biology? he discusses the Anthropic Principle and in addition to the well-explored physicist perspective he commends the explorations of Michael Denton of properties of the physical world that seem to be tuned to life's necessities and the Nobel-prizewinner Christian de Duve's assertion "to Monod's famous sentence 'The universe was not pregnant with life, nor the biosphere with man,' I reply: 'You are wrong. they were.'" and also discusses with caution Michael Behe's claims about irreducible complexity.

In 5. Second Thoughts he modifies some of his earlier positions somewhat, especially in relation to multiverse theory.

In 6. Kenotic Creation and Divine Action he discusses Arthur Peacocke and the nature of causality

In 7. Natural Science Temporality and Divine Action he identifies "four different metascientific accounts of the nature of time, each claiming to derive from contemporary physics"

In 8. Contemporaries he discusses the ideas of Wolfhart Pannenberg, Thomas F. Torrance and Paul Davies

In 9. Science and Theology in England he sketches "the long English history of interaction between theology and science" from Robert Grosseteste via Francis Bacon, Thomas Browne and Robert Boyle, citing Charles Kingsley, Aubrey Moore and Frederick Temple who "all played an important part in welcoming the insights of Charles Darwin" and noting that the great British physicists of the 19th Century "Faraday, Maxwell, Kelvin and Stokes were all men of deep religious faith" (p198). He "feels that every German theologian writes with Kant looking over one shoulder and Hegel looking over another" whereas the English "tend to enjoy a more relaxed relationship with philosophy"(p202)

== Reviews and comment ==
- Review by Prof Tom McLiesh for the Institute of Physics IoP Physics Web
- “Polkinghorne is eminently qualified to write on theology and science...[he] strongly argues theology's place in the postmodern university, drawing attention to its methodological affinity with the natural sciences. In both, he insists on a "bottom up" approach—that is, more pragmatic than systematic—in which biblical material and creation are read as evidence, not simply as revelation. Later, he locates himself in a group of scientist-theologians that includes Ian Barbour and Arthur Peacocke...[and] critically reviews Wolfhart Pannenberg and Thomas F. Torrance...The concluding chapter is a concise history of science and theology in England that corrects popular distortions connected with the reception and continuing influence of Darwin...an engaging discussion of an important, little understood disciplinary intersection as well as a congenial point of entry into Polkinghorne's influential work.” Steven Schroeder— Booklist
- “I can’t imagine anyone more qualified to write about science and theology than John Polkinghorne. This is a lively account of his intellectual and theological journey.”— Thomas Appelquist, Yale University
- “Irrespective one’s religious belief or non-belief, this book provides intellectual stimulation of a high order.”—Henry H. Bauer, Journal of Scientific Exploration
- “A gentle discourse, very thoughtful and very English, on the relationship between physics and theology. . . . Worthwhile and intelligent: Polkinghorne has the courage and the ambition to stroll onto a field where most would fear to tread.”— Kirkus Reviews
- “A welcome addition to university or seminary libraries.”— Library Journal
- “Polkinghorne is respected in the field of theology and science not only because of his credentials as a physicist and priest, but also because he is lucid writer who never uses interdisciplinary concepts as a smokescreen for sloppy thinking...Polkinghorne impresses with a rare combination of theological sensitivity and technical grasp of the scientific and metascientific issues involved.”— Publishers Weekly
- “An engaging examination of the science—and—religion dialogue written by a seminal figure in the field, John Polkinghorne gives his thoughts on reconciling the processes of the universe with the ideas behind theology. Polkinghorne writes with a gentle sensibility that allows even casual readers to appreciate the depth of his knowledge about the subject.”— Research News and Opportunities in Science and Theology
- “For those seeking a very accessible discussion of current issues in theology and science, albeit primarily physics, I highly recommend this book as well as Polkinghorne’s other books. He is the C. S. Lewis of our time in the science-theology dialogue.”—Eugene E. Selk, Theological Studies
- “Fascinating and engaging treatment in the interplay between physics and theology.”—Steven Norman, University Press Books for Public and Secondary School Libraries
