= Science and Theology =

1998 book by John Polkinghorne

- Author: John Polkinghorne
- Language: English
- Publisher: Society for Promoting Christian Knowledge
- Publication date: 1998
- Publication place: England
- Media type: Print
- Pages: 144
- ISBN: 978-0-281-05176-2
- Dewey Decimal: 261.5/5
- LC Class: BL240.2 .P57634

Science and Theology: An Introduction is a 1998 book written by the English physicist, theologian, and Anglican priest John Polkinghorne.
