= The Way the World Is =

Book by John Polkinghorne

- Author: John Polkinghorne
- Publication date: 1983
- ISBN: 978-0664232146

The Way the World Is: Christian Perspective of a Scientist is a book first published in 1983 by the John Polkinghorne, who was a Professor of Mathematical Physics at the University of Cambridge in the Department of Applied Mathematics and Theoretical Physics.

It is a short volume which was written in response to the surprise of a number of working scientists when Polkinghorne quit academic research in 1979 to train for ordination in the Church of England. He subsequently returned to Trinity Hall, Cambridge, as Dean in 1986, and later as the President of Queens' College, Cambridge.

== Synopsis ==
The first part of the book goes through the familiar territory of the scientist's 'Standard Model' of the universe from the Big Bang to the development of human life on Earth. Whilst discussing these the book gives an overview of quantum theory and indeterminism, which Polkinghorn believes represent a challenge to metaphysical naturalism. The book asserts that aspects of human experiences cannot be reduced to physics and biology.

The remaining chapters consider core Christian beliefs, New Testament history and how they fit into this perspective.

== Publication data ==
- The Way the World Is: Christian Perspective of a Scientist (2nd ed.). Society for Promoting Christian Knowledge. 1992. ISBN 0-281-04597-6.
