= Three Roads to Quantum Gravity =

Non-fiction book by American theoretical physicist Lee Smolin

Three Roads to Quantum Gravity: A New Understanding of Space, Time and the Universe
- Cover of the hardcover edition
- Author: Lee Smolin
- Language: English
- Series: Science Masters
- Subjects: Physics, quantum gravity
- Publisher: Basic Books
- Publication date: May 30, 2001
- Publication place: United States
- Media type: Print
- Pages: 240 pp.
- ISBN: 978-0465078356
- Preceded by: The Life of the Cosmos (1999)
- Followed by: The Trouble With Physics (2006)

Three Roads to Quantum Gravity: A New Understanding of Space, Time and the Universe is a non-fiction book by American theoretical physicist Lee Smolin. The book was initially published on May 30, 2001 by Basic Books as a part of the Science Masters series.

== Overview ==
Smolin discusses three potential approaches by which a unified theory of quantum gravity, arguably the foremost issue in theoretical physics, may be realized. Approaches discussed include string theory, M-theory, and Smolin's preferred approach, loop quantum gravity. Smolin suggests that these approaches may be approximations of a single, underlying theory.

== Reception ==
Divide an inch in two. Now divide each half again, and then repeat the division, over and over. Can you go on for ever, or do the laws of physics eventually get in the way? Is the fabric of space infinitely divisible, or is it ultimately made up of "atoms"—tiny chunks of space that can never be split? This question may seem almost unanswerable. But as physicist Lee Smolin writes in Three Roads to Quantum Gravity, some of the newest ideas in physics are pointing to a surprising answer: space and time do indeed appear to be made out of such atoms. In explaining why, he offers a tour by a skilled teacher through some of the boldest and most beautiful ideas of modern science. Smolin has been one of the leading figures in recent efforts to bring together two of the most far-reaching scientific theories of our age.

—The Guardian

== See also ==
- Background independence
- Quantum mechanics
- Quantum gravity
- Loop quantum gravity
- M-theory
- String theory
- Topos theory
