= Questions of Truth =

2009 book by John Polkinghorne and Nicholas Beale

- Author: John Polkinghorne; Nicholas Beale
- Language: English
- Subject: Science and religion, theology
- Genre: Non-fiction
- Publisher: Westminster John Knox
- Publication date: 2009
- Publication place: United States
- Media type: Print
- ISBN: 0-664-23351-1
- OCLC: 229467436
- Dewey Decimal: 215 pp.
- LC Class: BT77 .P65

Questions of Truth: Fifty-one Responses to Questions about God, Science, and Belief is a book by theoretical physicist and Anglican priest John Polkinghorne and social philosopher Nicholas Beale, which offers their responses to 51 questions about science and religion. The foreword is contributed by Antony Hewish, the recipient of the 1974 Nobel Prize in Physics.

The book was launched at a workshop at the 2009 American Association for the Advancement of Science Annual Meeting in Chicago, and then in the UK at a discussion at the Royal Society chaired by Onora O'Neill, in a week when it was also featured on the Today Programme.

== Key themes and ideas ==
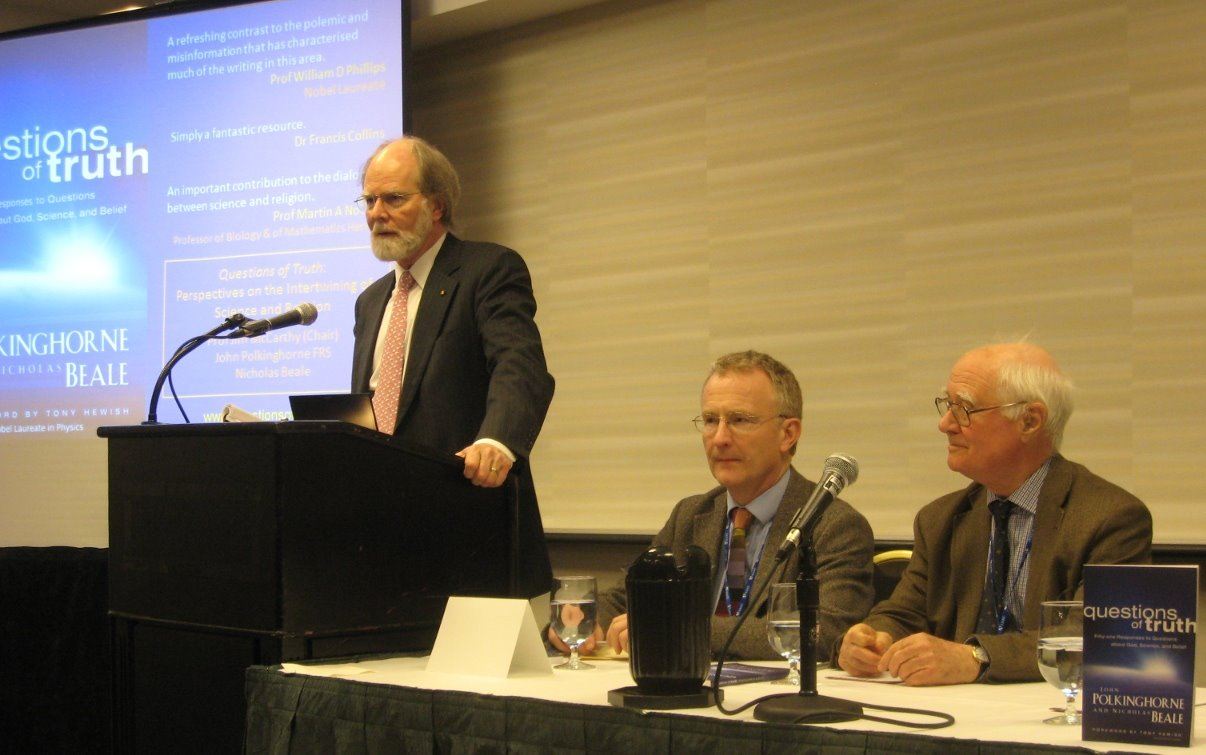
Launch at 2009 AAAS Annual Conference with President James J. McCarthy (standing) and authors

The book grew out of questions generated at a website organized to communicate Polkinghorne's ideas. It groups selected questions under seven topics:

- Leading questions gives an overview of Polkinghorne's views on nine questions, including science and religion, the existence of god, and atheism.
- The concept and existence of god begins with "Can God's existence be proved?" and addresses The God Delusion, omniscience, predestination and the Trinity.
- The Universe considers the Big Bang, the anthropic principle and a theory of everything.
- Evolution starts with "Is evolution a fact or a theory?", discusses intelligent design, which is deemed an unfortunate use of language and a theological mistake, and explores whether the mind can be explained by evolution.
- Evil suggests that "The evil that is not the result of human sin seems to be the result of the workings out of the natural laws of physics and biology" and considers the Devil, cancer and original sin.
- Human being suggests that Adam and Eve refer to the first spiritually conscious human beings, that the soul is something logically distinct from the body but not a separate physical entity, and that conscience is "our deepest understanding of right and wrong".
- Religion begins with "Is atheism a form of faith?", suggests that "For each part of the Bible you have to ask what kind of writing it is and what God is trying to tell us through it", and considers the Resurrection and that "God will not force us to accept his love ... [but] will save everyone he can - no-one will be excluded because God did not want them."

Each question is followed by the responses of Beale and Polkinghorne, sometimes as a single answer and sometimes by the two authors individually. Its three appendixes constitute a third of the book:

- Anthropic fine-tuning draws on Martin Rees's book Just Six Numbers to illustrate the point that if the fundamental constants of physics were slightly different then no intelligent life could exist in the Universe. It then considers multiverse ideas and especially Lee Smolin's cosmological natural selection, which, it suggests, has problems from physics and evolutionary dynamics. It also discusses notions of complexity and improbability.
- Brain and consciousness suggests that "pretty much everything in the universe has a physical aspect and an informational aspect, neither of which is more foundational than the other", and that informational entities like the Mass in B Minor cannot be considered as material objects. It proposes that "your body and your mind are different aspects of you", and that the inherent uncertainties of neuron firing mean that the brain is not fully deterministic.
- Evolution begins by pointing out that, since Augustine, Christians have not taken the Genesis creation accounts "literally", and that key developers of the current theory (e.g. Gregor Mendel, Ronald Fisher, Theodosius Dobzhansky, Simon Conway-Morris and Martin Nowak) have been Christians, suggesting that there is no conflict between Christianity and evolution, that small genetic changes can have big effects, that genetic determinism is mistaken, and that there are evolutionary benefits to religion.

== Reviews ==
Julian Baggini, writing in the Financial Times, said that Polkinghorne has no problems reconciling his faith with his science and suggests that "despite the complexity of some of the scientific issues discussed", the book "is a commendably clear read". He says "it is a pity that the people most likely to buy this book are those simply seeking intellectual reassurance that their faith is not irrational. Those who would most benefit from reading it are in fact fundamentalists who think that evolutionary science must be wrong, and overconfident atheists who believe that the religious are manifestly irrational."

Atheist A. C. Grayling wrote a highly critical review in the New Humanist, claiming that the responses to questions concerning science and religion boil down to three strategies, God of the gaps, inference to the best explanation, and religion and science explain truths in different domains. He considers the first two refutable by undergraduates, and for the third strategy to work, he contends that one has to "cherry-pick which bits of scripture and dogma are to be taken as symbolic and which as literally true" in order to conveniently avoid the possibility of direct and testable confrontation with science. He expresses his outrage at the Royal Society's decision to allow its premises to be used for the launch of the book, as in his opinion this amounts to having "the superstitious lucubrations of illiterate goatherds living several thousand years ago given the same credibility as contemporary scientific research."

Physics World commends the authors for handling the diverse readership, skeptics and believers, in a "remarkably even-handed way", but laments that concerns with specifics of Christian doctrine may limit the book's appeal; however, scientifically minded readers may find the extensive appendices a good starting point. The reviewer concludes that the book provides valuable insight for those interested in the science and religion debate.

In addition, some periodicals have included brief reviews. Publishers Weekly said, "Many readers will welcome this accessible format, but some may find the blurring of science and theology confusing." The Library Journal described it as intriguing and thought-provoking work, and said that John Polkinghorne was “a kind of antidote to Richard Dawkins and Sam Harris for the intellectual theist or Christian." Episcopal Life says the book offers "some interesting conclusions". Ian Sample, reflecting over his interview with Polkinghorne for The Guardian, stated that there was much in the book that he found offensive, especially the idea that God needs to remain hidden from his creation lest they be completely overwhelmed, a notion Sample describes as "a bit patronising".
