= Renata Kallosh =

Theoretical physicist

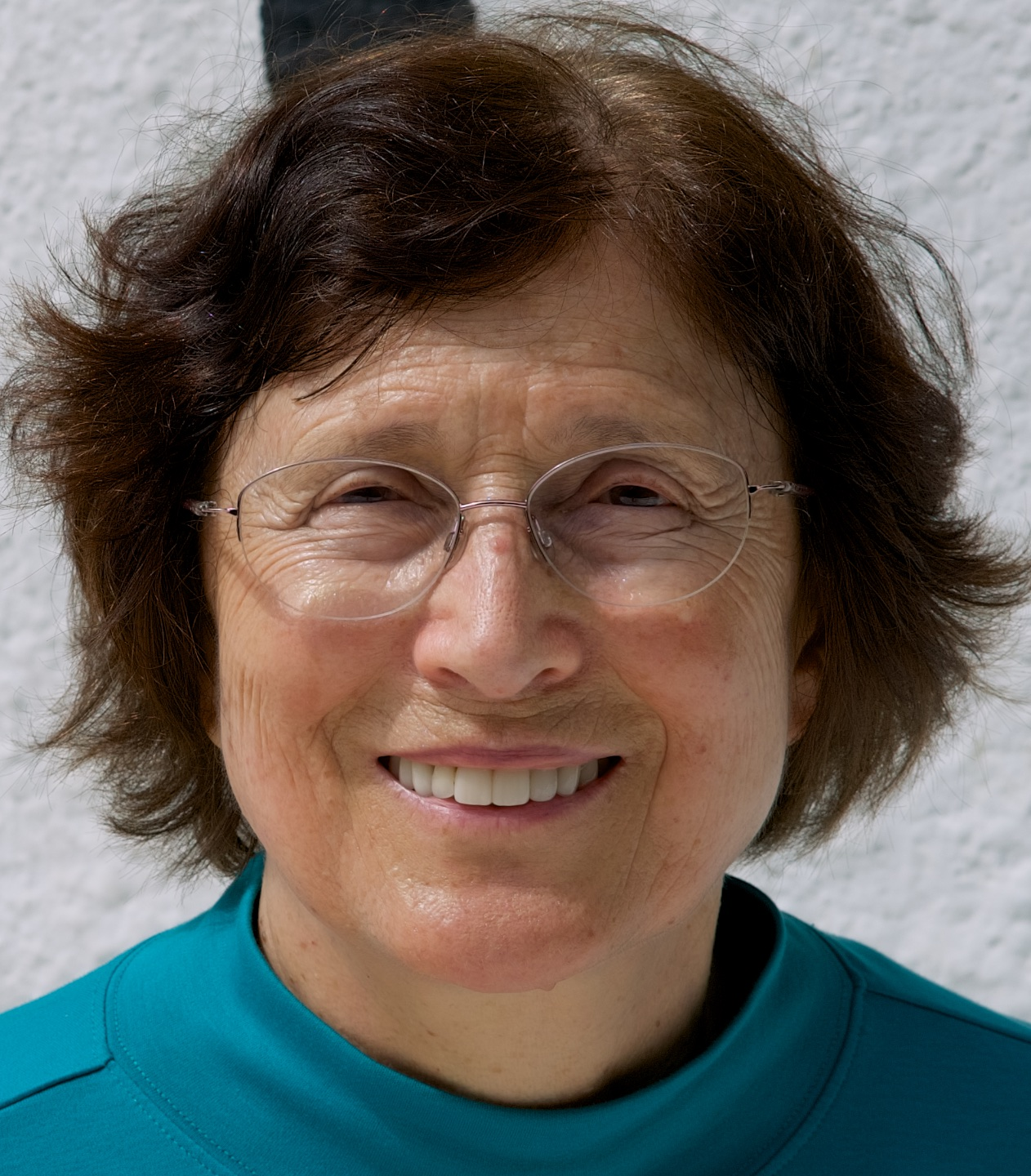
- Born: January 16, 1943 (age 83); Chernivtsi, Ukrainian SSR, Soviet Union
- Education: Moscow State University
- Known for: KKLT mechanism
- Spouse: Andrei Linde
- Scientific career
- Fields: Theoretical physics
- Workplaces: Lebedev Physical Institute; CERN; Stanford University

Renata Elizaveta Kallosh (Russian: Рената Елизавета (Эрнестовна) Каллош; Ukrainian: Рената Єлизавета Каллош; born 1943) is a Russian-American theoretical physicist. She is a professor of physics at Stanford University, working there on supergravity, string theory and inflationary cosmology.

== Biography ==
Kallosh was born in 1943 in Chernivtsi. She completed her Bachelor's from Moscow State University in 1966 and obtained her Ph.D. from Lebedev Physical Institute, Moscow in 1968. She was then a professor at the same Institute, before moving to CERN for a year in 1989. Kallosh joined Stanford in 1990. In 2022 she retired, but continues her research as a member of Stanford Institute for Theoretical Physics.

In 2009 she received the Lise Meitner Award of the Gothenburg University. In 2014 awarded Doctorate Honoris Causa of the University of Groningen. In 2017 she was awarded Lorentz Chair position at the University of Leiden, and became a member of the American Academy of Arts and Sciences. In 2024 she gave the Oskar Klein Memorial Lecture at Stockholm University and was awarded the Oscar Klein medal for her work on black hole attractors, supergravity and cosmology.

Kallosh is best known for her contributions to the theory of supergravity — the supersymmetric generalization of Einstein's theory of gravity. She was the first to quantize supergravity, obtaining the full set of Feynman rules including a new, unexpected ghost particle (now called the Nielsen-Kallosh ghost). This paper also gave one of the first applications of BRST symmetry to express the gauge invariances of gravity, and, incidentally, introduced the name "BRST". She also was the first to understand the structure of divergences in quantum theories of supergravity, showing, among other results, that supergravity with N=8 supersymmetry is finite at least up to 8 loops. She is the author of many papers on black hole solutions in supergravity theories. A particularly influential work is the recognition, in collaboration with Sergio Ferrara, that black hole solutions with higher supersymmetry have properties similar to attractor solutions of mechanical systems.

Kallosh is also known for her contributions to string theory. In particular, she, along with Sandip Trivedi, Andrei Linde, and Shamit Kachru, found the mechanism to stabilize string theory vacua referred to as KKLT mechanism after the authors' last names. This mechanism provided a possible theoretical explanation of the anomalously small value of vacuum energy (cosmological constant) and a description of the present stage of the accelerated expansion of the universe in the context of the theory of inflationary multiverse and string theory landscape.

After the discovery of the KKLT mechanism, her interests shifted towards investigation of cosmological implications of supergravity and string theory. In particular, Renata Kallosh and Andrei Linde, together with their collaborators, developed a theory of cosmological attractors. This is a broad class of versions of inflationary cosmology which provide one of the best fits to the latest observational data.
