= Exploring Reality =

2005 book by John Polkinghorne

Exploring Reality: The Intertwining of Science & Religion is a book by John Polkinghorne which offers a "progress report" on his "search for truth. All my life I have been trying to explore reality. That exploration includes science, but it also necessarily takes me beyond it. The process of investigation has a spiral character, as tackling the issues draws the explorer inwards towards a deeper engagement with the multidimensional character of reality"

== Publication Information ==
The book is published by SPCK in the UK and by Yale University Press in the US, in 2005. ISBN 0-300-11014-6

== Synopsis ==
In 1. Reality Polkinghorne explains "how natural the task of exploring reality is for someone whose intellectual formation has been in the sciences"(p xi) and asserts his belief in Critical realism against Postmodernism.

2. The Causal Nexus of the World suggests that "scientifically our knowledge is still pretty patchy, excellent within certain well-defined domains but often unable to make satisfactory connections between different domains. The problematic of the relationship of Quantum physics to Classical physics provides an instructive example" and also that "matters of causality ... are not finally settled by science alone. Ultimate conclusions have to rest on the foundation of a metaphysical decision."(p xii)

In 3. Human Nature he notes that Charles Kingsley and Frederick Temple welcomed Charles Darwin's insights, which also implied a level of continuity between humans and other animals. However he notes that humans abilities in language, science and rationality are very different from those of animals. He says "the fact that we share 98.4% of our DNA with chimpanzees shows the fallacy of genetic reductionism, rather than proving that we are only apes who are slightly different. After all I share 99.9% of my DNA with J. S. Bach, but that fact carries no implication of a close correspondence between our musical abilities"(p45). He suggests that "while natural selection has been an important factor in the development of life on Earth, it is by no means obvious that it is the only type of process involved" and that "the attempt to force classical Darwinian thinking into the role of an explanatory principle of almost universal scope has proved singularly unconvincing as it seeks to inflate an assembly of half-truths into a theory of everything". He believes that Evolutionary epistemology is also based on a half-truth. Being able to make sense of everyday experience is a vital asset, yet when Newton discovered universal gravity, something happened that went far beyond anything needed for survival and that rational feats like proving Fermat's Last Theorem go far beyond anything susceptible to Darwinian explanation.
