= Einstein's Unfinished Revolution =

Book by Lee Smolin

Einstein’s Unfinished Revolution: The Search for What Lies Beyond the Quantum
- Cover of the hardcover edition
- Authors: Lee Smolin
- Language: English
- Subjects: Physics, quantum mechanics
- Publisher: Penguin Press
- Publication date: April 9, 2019
- Publication place: United States
- Media type: Print, e-book
- Pages: 352 pp.
- ISBN: 978-1594206191
- OCLC: 1105382747
- Preceded by: The Singular Universe and the Reality of Time

Einstein's Unfinished Revolution: The Search for What Lies Beyond the Quantum is a non-fiction book on quantum mechanics by the American theoretical physicist Lee Smolin. The book was initially published by Penguin Press on April 9, 2019. In this book, his sixth, Smolin tries to provide criticism of quantum mechanics and offers alternative options for a theory of the atomic world.

== Reception ==
In his review for Physics World, Philip Ball wrote, "Quantum mechanics might simply be the mathematical tool we humans need to navigate in a particular kind of world that is fully objective, but can be glimpsed only via the indirect clues granted to six-foot beings. Smolin suggests that quantum mechanics insists we can only know half of all there is to know from a realist perspective. An alternative view, however, is that there is plenty that is "real" but that living in a classical world primes us to expect more answers than nature can supply." A reviewer for Publishers Weekly was generally positive while noting that the book was "Occasionally, necessarily, textbook-dry".

Reviewing the book for the Mathematical Association of America, Michael Berg commented, "Smolin's focus in the book and talk is the foundations of quantum mechanics and the claim that there is something rotten in Denmark, in other words, with the Copenhagen interpretation of quantum mechanics as spearheaded by Niels Bohr, and, 369 miles south in Göttingen, Max Born... I like the book, but be forewarned, it is somewhat idiosyncratic." Graham Farmelo of Nature added, "Rewarding as it is, I doubt Einstein's Unfinished Revolution will convert many of Smolin’s critics. To do that, he will need to present his ideas more rigorously than he could reasonably do in a popular book."
