= String theory landscape =

Collection of possible string theory vacua

In string theory, the string theory landscape (or landscape of vacua) is the collection of possible false vacua, together comprising a collective "landscape" of choices of parameters governing compactifications.

The term "landscape" comes from the notion of a fitness landscape in evolutionary biology. It was first applied to cosmology by Lee Smolin in his book The Life of the Cosmos (1997), and was first used in the context of string theory by Leonard Susskind.

== Compactified Calabi–Yau manifolds ==
In string theory, the estimated count of distinct false vacua is commonly stated as having a lower bound of $10^{500}$, but more recently this has been revised to $10^{272,000}$, and the true number may still be far higher. The large number of possibilities arises from choices of Calabi–Yau manifolds and choices of generalized magnetic fluxes over various homology cycles, found in F-theory.

If there is no structure in the space of vacua, the problem of finding one with a sufficiently small cosmological constant is NP complete. This is a version of the subset sum problem.

A possible mechanism of string theory vacuum stabilization, now known as the KKLT mechanism, was proposed in 2003 by Shamit Kachru, Renata Kallosh, Andrei Linde, and Sandip Trivedi.

== Fine-tuning by the anthropic principle ==
Fine-tuning of constants like the cosmological constant or the Higgs boson mass is usually assumed to occur for precise physical reasons as opposed to taking their particular values at random. That is, these values should be uniquely consistent with underlying physical laws.

The number of theoretically allowed configurations has prompted suggestions that this is not the case, and that many different vacua are physically realized. The anthropic principle proposes that fundamental constants may have the values they have because such values are necessary for life (and therefore intelligent observers to measure the constants). The anthropic landscape thus refers to the collection of those portions of the landscape that are suitable for supporting intelligent life.

=== Weinberg model ===
In 1987, Steven Weinberg proposed that the observed value of the cosmological constant was so small because it is impossible for life to occur in a universe with a much larger cosmological constant.

Weinberg attempted to predict the magnitude of the cosmological constant based on probabilistic arguments. Other attempts have been made to apply similar reasoning to models of particle physics.

Such attempts are based in the general ideas of Bayesian probability; interpreting probability in a context where it is only possible to draw one sample from a distribution is problematic in frequentist probability but not in Bayesian probability, which is not defined in terms of the frequency of repeated events.

In such a framework, the probability $P(x)$ of observing some fundamental parameters $x$ is given by,

$$P(x)=P_{\mathrm{prior}}(x)\times P_{\mathrm{selection}}(x),$$

where $P_\mathrm{prior}$ is the prior probability, from fundamental theory, of the parameters $x$ and $P_\mathrm{selection}$ is the "anthropic selection function", determined by the number of "observers" that would occur in the universe with parameters $x$.

These probabilistic arguments are the most controversial aspect of the landscape. Technical criticisms of these proposals have pointed out that:

- The function $P_\mathrm{prior}$ is completely unknown in string theory and may be impossible to define or interpret in any sensible probabilistic way.
- The function $P_\mathrm{selection}$ is completely unknown, since so little is known about the origin of life. Simplified criteria (such as the number of galaxies) must be used as a proxy for the number of observers. Moreover, it may never be possible to compute it for parameters radically different from those of the observable universe.

=== Simplified approaches ===
Tegmark et al. have recently considered these objections and proposed a simplified anthropic scenario for axion dark matter in which they argue that the first two of these problems do not apply.

Vilenkin and collaborators have proposed a consistent way to define the probabilities for a given vacuum.

A problem with many of the simplified approaches people have tried is that they "predict" a cosmological constant that is too large by a factor of 10–1000 orders of magnitude (depending on one's assumptions) and hence suggest that the cosmic acceleration should be much more rapid than is observed.

=== Interpretation ===
Few dispute the large number of metastable vacua. The existence, meaning, and scientific relevance of the anthropic landscape, however, remain controversial.

==== Cosmological constant problem ====
Andrei Linde, Sir Martin Rees and Leonard Susskind advocate it as a solution to the cosmological constant problem.

=== Weak scale supersymmetry from the landscape ===
The string landscape ideas can be applied to the notion of weak scale supersymmetry and the Little Hierarchy problem. For string vacua which include the MSSM (Minimal Supersymmetric Standard Model) as the low energy effective field theory, all values of SUSY breaking fields are expected to be equally likely on the landscape. This led Douglas and others to propose that the SUSY breaking scale is distributed as a power law in the landscape $P_{prior}\sim m_{soft}^{2n_F+n_D-1}$ where $n_F$ is the number of F-breaking fields (distributed as complex numbers) and $n_D$ is the number of D-breaking fields (distributed as real numbers). Next, one may impose the Agrawal, Barr, Donoghue, Seckel (ABDS) anthropic requirement that the derived weak scale lie within a factor of a few of our measured value (lest nuclei as needed for life as we know it become unstable (the atomic principle)). Combining these effects with a mild power-law draw to large soft SUSY breaking terms, one may calculate the Higgs boson and superparticle masses expected from the landscape. The Higgs mass probability distribution peaks around 125 GeV while sparticles (with the exception of light higgsinos) tend to lie well beyond current LHC search limits. This approach is an example of the application of stringy naturalness.

==== Scientific relevance ====
David Gross suggests that the idea is inherently unscientific, unfalsifiable or premature. A famous debate on the anthropic landscape of string theory is the Smolin–Susskind debate on the merits of the landscape.

==== Popular reception ====
There are several popular books about the anthropic principle in cosmology. The authors of two physics blogs, Lubos Motl and Peter Woit, are opposed to this use of the anthropic principle.

== See also ==
- Swampland
- Extra dimensions
- M-theory
