= Lee Smolin =

American theoretical physicist (born 1955)

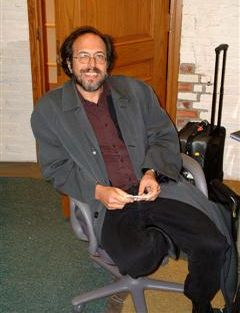
- Smolin in 2004
- Born: June 6, 1955 (age 71); New York City, US
- Education: Hampshire College (B.A.); Harvard University (A.M., Ph.D)
- Known for: Cosmological natural selection Loop quantum gravity Criticism of string theory
- Relatives: David M. Smolin (brother)
- Awards: Majorana Prize (2007); Klopsteg Memorial Award (2009); Queen Elizabeth II Diamond Jubilee Medal (2013)
- Scientific career
- Fields: Physics; Cosmology
- Workplaces: Perimeter Institute, University of Waterloo
- Doctoral advisor: Sidney Coleman; Stanley Deser

Lee Smolin (/ˈsmoʊlɪn/; born June 6, 1955) is an American theoretical physicist, a founding member of the Perimeter Institute for Theoretical Physics, an adjunct professor of physics at the University of Waterloo, and a member of the graduate faculty of the philosophy department at the University of Toronto. Smolin's 2006 book The Trouble with Physics criticized string theory's viability. He has made contributions to quantum gravity theory, in particular the approach known as loop quantum gravity. He advocates that the two primary approaches to quantum gravity, loop quantum gravity and string theory, can be reconciled as different aspects of the same underlying theory. He also advocates an alternative view on space and time that he calls temporal naturalism. His research interests also include cosmology, elementary particle theory, the foundations of quantum mechanics, and theoretical biology.

== Early life and education ==
Smolin was born in New York City to Michael Smolin, an environmental and process engineer and Pauline Smolin, a playwright. Smolin said his parents were Jewish followers of the Fourth Way, founded by George Gurdjieff, an Armenian mystic. Smolin describes himself as Jewish. His brother, David M. Smolin, became a professor at the Cumberland School of Law in Birmingham, Alabama.

Smolin dropped out of Walnut Hills High School in Cincinnati, Ohio. His interest in physics began at that time when he read Einstein's reflections on the two tasks he would leave unfinished at his death: 1, to make sense of quantum mechanics, and, 2 to unify that understanding of the quanta with gravity. Smolin would take it as his "mission" to try to complete these tasks. Shortly afterward, he browsed the Physics Library at the University of Cincinnati, where he came across Louis de Broglie's pilot wave theory in French. "I still can close my eyes," Smolin wrote in Einstein's Unfinished Revolution, "and see a page of the book, displaying the equation that relates wavelength to momentum." Soon after that he would "talk his way into" Hampshire College, find great teachers, and get lucky in his applications to graduate school. As to his mission of solving Einstein's two big questions, by Smolin's account, he did not succeed; "Very unfortunately, neither has anyone else."

== Career ==
He held postdoctoral research positions at the Institute for Advanced Study in Princeton, New Jersey, the Kavli Institute for Theoretical Physics in Santa Barbara, and the University of Chicago, before becoming a faculty member at Yale, Syracuse, and Pennsylvania State Universities. He was a visiting scholar at the Institute for Advanced Study in 1995 and a visiting professor at Imperial College London (1999–2001), before becoming one of the founding faculty members at the Perimeter Institute in 2001. In 2026, he agreed to "pause" his relationship with the Institute in light of revelations that he had maintained contact with Jeffrey Epstein after the latter's initial conviction.

== Theories and work ==
=== Loop quantum gravity ===
Smolin contributed to the theory of loop quantum gravity (LQG) in collaborative work with Ted Jacobson, Carlo Rovelli, Louis Crane, Abhay Ashtekar and others. LQG is an approach to the unification of quantum mechanics with general relativity which utilizes a reformulation of general relativity in the language of gauge field theories, which allows the use of techniques from particle physics, particularly the expression of fields in terms of the dynamics of loops. With Rovelli he discovered the discreteness of areas and volumes and found their natural expression in terms of a discrete description of quantum geometry in terms of spin networks. In recent years he has focused on connecting LQG to phenomenology by developing implications for experimental tests of spacetime symmetries as well as investigating ways elementary particles and their interactions could emerge from spacetime geometry.

=== Background independent approaches to string theory ===
Between 1999 and 2002, Smolin made several proposals to provide a fundamental formulation of string theory that does not depend on approximate descriptions involving classical background spacetime models.

=== Experimental tests of quantum gravity ===
Smolin is among those theorists who have proposed that the effects of quantum gravity can be experimentally probed by searching for modifications in special relativity detected in observations of high energy astrophysical phenomena, including very high energy cosmic rays and photons and neutrinos from gamma ray bursts. Among Smolin's contributions are the co-invention of doubly special relativity (with João Magueijo, independently of work by Giovanni Amelino-Camelia), and of relative locality (with Amelino-Camelia, Laurent Freidel, and Jerzy Kowalski-Glikman).

=== Foundations of quantum mechanics ===
Smolin has worked since the early 1980s on a series of proposals for hidden variables theories, which would be non-local deterministic theories which would give a precise description of individual quantum phenomena. In recent years, he has pioneered two new approaches to the interpretation of quantum mechanics suggested by his work on the reality of time, called the real ensemble interpretation and the principle of precedence.

=== Cosmological natural selection ===
Smolin's hypothesis of cosmological natural selection, also called the fecund universes theory, suggests that a process analogous to biological natural selection applies at the grandest of scales. Smolin published the idea in 1992 and summarized it in a book aimed at a lay audience called The Life of the Cosmos.

Black holes have a role in this natural selection. In fecund theory, a collapsing black hole causes the emergence of a new universe on the "other side", whose fundamental constant parameters (masses of elementary particles, Planck constant, elementary charge, and so forth) may differ slightly from the universe where the black hole collapsed. Each universe gives rise to as many new universes—its "offspring"—as it has black holes, giving an evolutionary advantage to universes in which black holes are common, which are similar to our own. The theory thus explains why our universe appears "fine-tuned" for the emergence of life as we know it. Because the theory applies the evolutionary concepts of "reproduction", "mutation", and "selection" to universes, it is formally analogous to models of population biology.

When Smolin published the theory in 1992, he proposed as a prediction of his theory that no neutron star should exist with a mass of more than 1.6 times the mass of the sun. Later this figure was raised to two solar masses following more precise modeling of neutron star interiors by nuclear astrophysicists. Smolin also predicted that inflation, if true, must only be in its simplest form, governed by a single field and parameter.

=== Contributions to the philosophy of physics ===
Smolin has contributed to the philosophy of physics through a series of papers and books that advocate the relational, or Leibnizian, view of space and time. Since 2006, he has collaborated with the Brazilian philosopher and Harvard Law School professor Roberto Mangabeira Unger on the issues of the reality of time and the evolution of laws; in 2014 they published a book, its two parts being written separately.

A book length exposition of Smolin's philosophical views appeared in April 2013. Time Reborn argues that physical science has made time unreal while, as Smolin insists, it is the most fundamental feature of reality: "Space may be an illusion, but time must be real" (p. 179). An adequate description according to him would give a Leibnizian universe: indiscernibles would not be admitted and every difference should correspond to some other difference, as the principle of sufficient reason would have it. A few months later a more concise text was made available in a paper with the title Temporal Naturalism.

== The Trouble with Physics ==
Smolin's 2006 book The Trouble with Physics explored the role of controversy and disagreement in the progress of science. It argued that science progresses fastest if the scientific community encourages the widest possible disagreement among trained and accredited professionals prior to the formation of consensus brought about by experimental confirmation of predictions of falsifiable theories. He proposed that this meant the fostering of diverse competing research programs, and that premature formation of paradigms not forced by experimental facts can slow the progress of science.

As a case study, The Trouble with Physics focused on the issue of the falsifiability of string theory due to the proposals that the anthropic principle be used to explain the properties of our universe in the context of the string landscape. The book was criticized by physicist Joseph Polchinski and other string theorists.

In his earlier book Three Roads to Quantum Gravity (2002), Smolin stated that loop quantum gravity and string theory were essentially the same concept seen from different perspectives. In that book, he also favored the holographic principle. The Trouble with Physics, on the other hand, was strongly critical of the prominence of string theory in contemporary theoretical physics, which he believes has suppressed research in other promising approaches. Smolin suggests that string theory suffers from serious deficiencies and has an unhealthy near-monopoly in the particle theory community. He called for a diversity of approaches to quantum gravity, and argued that more attention should be paid to loop quantum gravity, an approach Smolin has devised. Finally, The Trouble with Physics is also broadly concerned with the role of controversy and the value of diverse approaches in the ethics and process of science.

In the same year that The Trouble with Physics was published, Peter Woit published Not Even Wrong, a book for nonspecialists whose conclusion was similar to Smolin's, namely that string theory was a fundamentally flawed research program.

== Views ==
In an excerpt from The Trouble With Physics, Smolin stated his view on the nature of time:

More and more, I have the feeling that quantum theory and general relativity are both deeply wrong about the nature of time. It is not enough to combine them. There is a deeper problem, perhaps going back to the beginning of physics.

Smolin does not believe that quantum mechanics is a "final theory":

I am convinced that quantum mechanics is not a final theory. I believe this because I have never encountered an interpretation of the present formulation of quantum mechanics that makes sense to me. I have studied most of them in depth and thought hard about them, and in the end I still can't make real sense of quantum theory as it stands.

In a 2009 article, Smolin articulated the philosophy (italics are quotations):

- There is only one universe. There are no others, nor is there anything isomorphic to it. Smolin denies the existence of a "timeless" multiverse. Neither other universes nor copies of our universe—within or outside—exist. No copies can exist within the universe, because no subsystem can model precisely the larger system it is a part of. No copies can exist outside the universe, because the universe is by definition all there is. This principle also rules out the notion of a mathematical object isomorphic in every respect to the history of the entire universe, a notion more metaphysical than scientific.
- All that is real is real in a moment, which is a succession of moments. Anything that is true is true of the present moment. Not only is time real, but everything that is real is situated in time. Nothing exists timelessly.
- Everything that is real in a moment is a process of change leading to the next or future moments. Anything that is true is then a feature of a process in this process causing or implying future moments. This principle incorporates the notion that time is an aspect of causal relations. A reason for asserting it, is that anything that existed for just one moment, without causing or implying some aspect of the world at a future moment, would be gone in the next moment. Things that persist must be thought of as processes leading to newly changed processes. An atom at one moment is a process leading to a different or a changed atom at the next moment.
- Mathematics is derived from experience as a generalization of observed regularities, when time and particularity are removed. Under this heading, Smolin distances himself from mathematical platonism, and gives his reaction to Eugene Wigner's "The Unreasonable Effectiveness of Mathematics in the Natural Sciences".

Smolin views rejecting the idea of a creator as essential to cosmology on similar grounds to his objections against the multiverse. He does not definitively exclude or reject religion or mysticism but rather believes that science should only deal with that which is observable. He also opposes the anthropic principle, which he claims "cannot help us to do science."

He also advocates "principles for an open future" which he claims underlie the work of both healthy scientific communities and democratic societies: "(1) When rational argument from public evidence suffices to decide a question, it must be considered to be so decided. (2) When rational argument from public evidence does not suffice to decide a question, the community must encourage a diverse range of viewpoints and hypotheses consistent with a good-faith attempt to develop convincing public evidence." (Time Reborn p. 265.)

Lee Smolin has been a recurring guest on Through the Wormhole.

== Awards and honors ==
Smolin was named as #21 on Foreign Policy magazine's list of Top 100 Public Intellectuals. He is also one of many physicists dubbed the "New Einstein" by the media. The Trouble with Physics was named by Newsweek magazine as number 17 on a list of 50 "Books for our Time", June 27, 2009. In 2007 he was awarded the Majorana Prize from the Electronic Journal of Theoretical Physics, and in 2009 the Klopsteg Memorial Award from the American Association of Physics Teachers (AAPT) for "extraordinary accomplishments in communicating the excitement of physics to the general public," He is a fellow of the Royal Society of Canada and the American Physical Society. In 2014 he was awarded the Buchalter Cosmology Prize for a work published in collaboration with Marina Cortês.

== Personal life and family ==
Smolin has stayed involved with theatre becoming a scientific consultant for such plays as A Walk in the Woods by Lee Blessing, Background Interference by Drucilla Cornell, and Infinity by Hannah Moscovitch.

Smolin is married to Dina Graser, a lawyer and urban policy consultant in Toronto, Ontario. He was previously married to Fotini Markopoulou-Kalamara. His brother is law professor David M. Smolin.

In 2003, Smolin contributed a note to Jeffrey Epstein's birthday book. In 2019, Smolin told The Verge he had not been in contact with Epstein since 2008, the same year he had pleaded guilty to charges of solicitation of prostitution and of solicitation of prostitution with a minor under the age of 18. However, upon the release of the Epstein files in 2025 and 2026, it was found Smolin had been in contact with Epstein as recently as 2013. Among the emails was an invitation from Epstein to the US Virgin Islands in 2011. As a result, Smolin's working relationship with the Perimeter Institute was paused.

== Publications ==
- 1997. The Life of the Cosmos ISBN 0195126645
- 2001. Three Roads to Quantum Gravity ISBN 0-465-07835-4
- 2006. The Trouble With Physics: The Rise of String Theory, the Fall of a Science, and What Comes Next. Houghton Mifflin. ISBN 978-0-618-55105-7
- 2013. Time Reborn: From the Crisis in Physics to the Future of the Universe. ISBN 978-0547511726
- 2014. The Singular Universe and the Reality of Time: A Proposal in Natural Philosophy by Lee Smolin and Roberto Mangabeira Unger, Cambridge University Press, ISBN 978-1107074064
- 2019. Einstein’s Unfinished Revolution: The Search for What Lies Beyond the Quantum, Penguin Press. ISBN 9781594206191

== See also ==
- List of University of Waterloo people
