= Serafino Raffaele Minich =

Croatian-Italian mathematician (1808–1883)

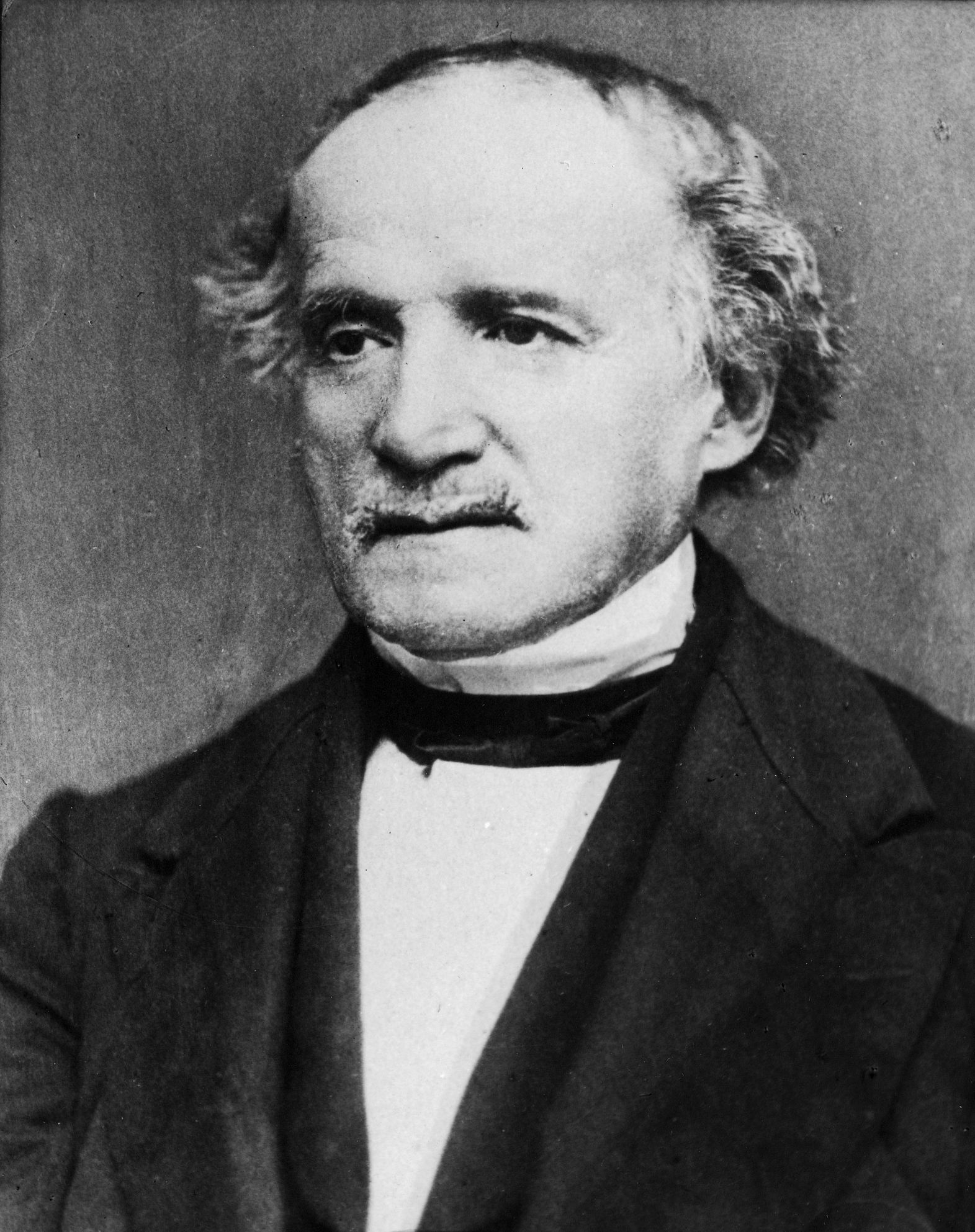
Serafino Raffaele Minich

Serafino Raffaele Minich or Serafin Rafael Minić (8 December 1808 – 29 May 1883) was a Croatian-Italian mathematician.

Minić was born in Venice. His father, a sea captain from Prčanj, settled in the early nineteenth century in Venice where Minić has spent his entire life. After receiving a degree in mathematics at the University of Padua, in 1830 he started working at the University as an assistant, and since 1842 as a lecturer.

During his lifetime, he served as the rector of the University of Padua, dean of the Faculty of Arts, dean of the Faculty of Science, and for several years he led the Istituto di scienze, letere ed arti in Venice.

He published more than 60 papers in the theory of differential equations, algebra, mechanics and hydraulics. In 1875–76 he led the project of altering the port on Lido in Venice and regulating the flow of the river Brenta. He wrote several treatises on Dante, Petrarch and Tasso. In the hall of the University of Padua a memorial is raised in his honor.

He died in Venice.
