= Not even wrong =

English phrase

"Not even wrong" is a phrase used to describe pseudoscience or bad science. It describes an argument or explanation that purports to be scientific but uses faulty reasoning or speculative premises, which can be neither affirmed nor denied and thus cannot be discussed rigorously and scientifically.

== Origin of the expression ==
The phrase is generally attributed to the theoretical physicist Wolfgang Pauli, who was known for his colorful objections to incorrect or careless thinking.

Rudolf Peierls documents an instance in which "a friend showed Pauli the paper of a young physicist which he suspected was not of great value but on which he wanted Pauli's views. Pauli remarked sadly, 'It is not even wrong'." This may also be quoted as "That is not only not right; it is not even wrong", or in Pauli's native German, "Das ist nicht nur nicht richtig; es ist nicht einmal falsch!" Peierls remarks that quite a few apocryphal stories of this kind have been circulated, and mentions that he listed only the ones personally vouched for by him. He quotes another example when Pauli replied to Lev Landau, "What you said was so confused that one could not tell whether it was nonsense or not."

In this model, a distinction is drawn between things that are simply wrong (e.g., due to an ordinary factual or logical error) and things that are so completely wrong that proving their errors was hopeless.

Peter Woit uses the phrase "not even wrong" to mean "unfalsifiable".

== See also ==
- Category mistake – Ascribing an impossible property to a thing
