= John Polkinghorne =

English physicist and priest (1930–2021)

The Reverend Canon John Polkinghorne KBE FRS
- Polkinghorne in 2007

President of Queens' College, Cambridge
- In office 1988–1996
- Preceded by: Ronald Oxburgh
- Succeeded by: Lord Eatwell

Personal details
- Born: John Charlton Polkinghorne; 16 October 1930 Weston-super-Mare, Somerset, England
- Died: 9 March 2021 (aged 90) Cambridge, England
- Citizenship: United Kingdom
- Spouse: Ruth Polkinghorne (m. 1955)
- Awards: Fellow of the Royal Society (1974); KBE (1997); Templeton Prize (2002)

Ecclesiastical career
- Church: Church of England
- Ordained: 1981 (deacon); 1982 (priest)
- Offices held: Vicar of Blean (1984–1986); Dean of Chapel at Trinity Hall, Cambridge (1986–1989); Canon Theologian of Liverpool Cathedral (1994–2005)

Academic background
- Education: Trinity College, Cambridge (BA, PhD)
- Thesis: Contributions to Quantum Field Theory (1955)
- Doctoral advisor: Nicholas Kemmer; Abdus Salam
- Influences: Ian Barbour; Paul Dirac; Murray Gell-Mann; Bernard Lonergan; Jürgen Moltmann; Michael Polanyi; W. H. Vanstone

Academic work
- Discipline: Physics; theology
- Sub-discipline: Mathematical physics; particle physics
- School or tradition: Evangelical Anglicanism; theological critical realism
- Institutions: University of Edinburgh; Trinity Hall, Cambridge; Queens' College, Cambridge
- Doctoral students: David Fairlie; Peter Goddard; Peter Landshoff; Sir Tom Kibble; James Stirling
- Main interests: Quantum field theory; relationship between science and religion
- Notable works: The Way the World Is (1983); Faith, Science and Understanding (2000)

John Charlton Polkinghorne (16 October 1930 – 9 March 2021) was a Cornish theoretical physicist, theologian, and Anglican priest. A prominent and leading voice explaining the relationship between science and religion, he was professor of mathematical physics at the University of Cambridge from 1968 to 1979, when he resigned his chair to study for the priesthood, becoming an ordained Anglican priest in 1982. He served as the president of Queens' College, Cambridge, from 1988 until 1996.

Polkinghorne was the author of five books on physics and twenty-six on the relationship between science and religion; his publications include The Quantum World (1989), Quantum Physics and Theology: An Unexpected Kinship (2005), Exploring Reality: The Intertwining of Science and Religion (2007), and Questions of Truth (2009). The Polkinghorne Reader (edited by Thomas Jay Oord) provides key excerpts from Polkinghorne's most influential books. He was knighted in 1997 and in 2002 received the £1-million Templeton Prize, awarded for exceptional contributions to affirming life's spiritual dimension.

== Early life and education ==
John Charlton Polkinghorne was born in Weston-super-Mare in Somerset on 16 October 1930 to Dorothy Charlton, the daughter of a groom and George Polkinghorne, who worked for the post office. John was the couple's third child. He had a brother, Peter, and a sister, Ann, who died when she was six, one month before John's birth. Peter died in 1942 while flying for the Royal Air Force during the Second World War. Polkinghorne's father was from a large Cornish family but John's parents became estranged from his grandparents before he was born. Despite being born in Somerset he identified himself as Cornish, rather than English, part of the Celtic fringe.

He was educated at the local primary school in Street, Somerset, then was taught by a friend of the family at home, and later at a Quaker school. When he was 11 he went to Elmhurst Grammar School in Street, and when his father was promoted to head postmaster in Ely in 1945, Polkinghorne was transferred to The Perse School, Cambridge. Following National Service in the Royal Army Educational Corps from 1948 to 1949, he read mathematics at Trinity College, Cambridge, graduating in 1952 as Senior Wrangler, then earned his PhD in physics in 1955, supervised by the Nobel laureate Abdus Salam in the group led by Paul Dirac.

== Career ==
=== Physics ===
Polkinghorne joined the Christian Union of UCCF while at Cambridge and met his future wife, Ruth Martin, another member of the union and also a mathematics student. They married on 26 March 1955, and at the end of that year sailed from Liverpool to New York. Polkinghorne accepted a postdoctoral Harkness Fellowship with the California Institute of Technology, where he worked with Murray Gell-Mann. Toward the end of the fellowship he was offered a position as lecturer at the University of Edinburgh, which he took up in 1956.

After two years in Scotland, he returned to teach at Cambridge in 1958. He was promoted to reader in 1965, and in 1968 was offered a professorship in mathematical physics, a position he held until 1979, his students including Brian Josephson and Martin Rees. For 25 years, he worked on theories about elementary particles, played a role in the discovery of the quark, and researched the analytic and high-energy properties of Feynman integrals and the foundations of S-matrix theory. While employed by Cambridge, he also spent time at Princeton, Berkeley, Stanford, and at CERN in Geneva. He was elected a Fellow of the Royal Society in 1974.

=== Priesthood and Queens' College ===
Polkinghorne decided to train for the priesthood in 1977. He said in an interview that he felt he had done his bit for science after 25 years, and that his best mathematical work was probably behind him; Christianity had always been central to his life, so ordination offered an attractive second career. He resigned his chair in 1979 to study at Westcott House, Cambridge, an Anglican theological college, becoming an ordained priest on 6 June 1982 (Trinity Sunday). The service was held at Trinity College, Cambridge, and presided over by Bishop John A. T. Robinson. He worked for five years as a curate in south Bristol, then as vicar in Blean, Kent, before returning to Cambridge in 1986 as dean of chapel at Trinity Hall. He became the president of Queens' College that year, a position he held until his retirement in 1996. He served as canon theologian of Liverpool Cathedral from 1994 to 2005. Polkinghorne died on 9 March 2021 at the age of 90.

=== Awards ===
In 1997 Polkinghorne was made a Knight Commander of the Order of the British Empire (KBE), although as an ordained priest in the Church of England, he was not styled as "Sir John Polkinghorne". He was an honorary fellow of St Chad's College, Durham, and was awarded an honorary doctorate by the University of Durham in 1998; and in 2002 was awarded the Templeton Prize for his contributions to research at the interface between science and religion. He spoke on "The Universe as Creation" at the Trotter Prize ceremony in 2003.

He has been a member of the BMA Medical Ethics Committee, the General Synod of the Church of England, the Doctrine Commission, and the Human Genetics Commission. He served as chairman of the governors of The Perse School from 1972 to 1981. He was a fellow of Queens' College, Cambridge, and was for 10 years a canon theologian of Liverpool Cathedral. He was a founding member of the Society of Ordained Scientists and also of the International Society for Science and Religion, of which he was the first president. He was selected to give the prestigious Gifford Lectures in 1993–1994, which he later published as The Faith of a Physicist.

In 2006 he was awarded an honorary doctorate by the Hong Kong Baptist University as part of their 50-year celebrations. This included giving a public lecture on "The Dialogue between Science and Religion and Its Significance for the Academy" and an "East–West Dialogue" with Yang Chen-Ning, a Nobel laureate in physics. He was a member of staff of the Psychology and Religion Research Group at Cambridge University. He was an honorary fellow of St Edmund's College, Cambridge.

== Ideas ==
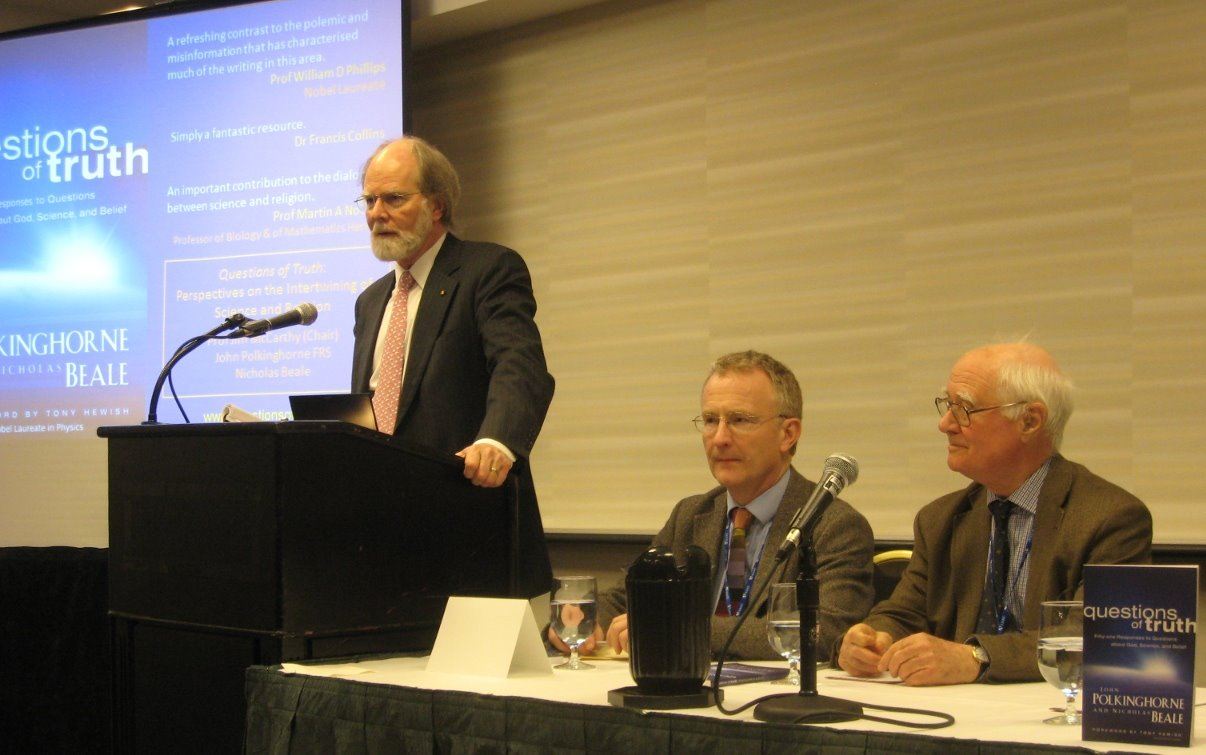
Polkinghorne (right) at the 2009 AAAS Annual Conference, during the launch workshop of Questions of Truth

Polkinghorne said in an interview that he believes his move from science to religion has given him binocular vision, though he understands that it has aroused the kind of suspicion "that might follow the claim to be a vegetarian butcher." He describes his position as critical realism and believes that science and religion address aspects of the same reality. It is a consistent theme of his work that when he "turned his collar around" he did not stop seeking truth. He argues there are five points of comparison between the ways in which science and theology pursue truth: moments of enforced radical revision, a period of unresolved confusion, new synthesis and understanding, continued wrestling with unresolved problems, deeper implications.

He suggests that the mechanistic explanations of the world that have continued from Laplace to Richard Dawkins should be replaced by an understanding that most of nature is cloud-like rather than clock-like. He regards the mind, soul and body as different aspects of the same underlying reality—"dual aspect monism"—writing that "there is only one stuff in the world (not two—the material and the mental), but it can occur in two contrasting states (material and mental phases, a physicist might say) which explain our perception of the difference between mind and matter." He believes that standard physical causation cannot adequately describe the manifold ways in which things and people interact, and uses the phrase "active information" to describe how, when several outcomes are possible, there may be higher levels of causation that choose which one occurs.

Sometimes Christianity seems to him to be just too good to be true, but when this sort of doubt arises he says to himself, "All right then, deny it", and writes that he knows this is something he could never do.

=== On the existence of God ===
Polkinghorne considers that "the question of the existence of God is the single most important question we face about the nature of reality" and quotes, with approval, Sir Anthony Kenny: "After all, if there is no God, then God is incalculably the greatest single creation of the human imagination." He addresses the questions of "Does the concept of God make sense? If so, do we have reason for believing in such a thing?" He is "cautious about our powers to assess coherence", pointing out that in 1900 a "competent... undergraduate could have demonstrated the 'incoherence'" of quantum ideas. He suggests that "the nearest analogy in the physical world [to God] would be... the Quantum Vacuum."

He suggests that God is the ultimate answer to Leibniz's great question "why is there something rather than nothing?" The atheist's "plain assertion of the world's existence" is a "grossly impoverished view of reality... [arguing that] theism explains more than a reductionist atheism can ever address.".

He is very doubtful of St Anselm's Ontological Argument. Referring to Gödel's incompleteness theorem, he said: "If we cannot prove the consistency of arithmetic it seems a bit much to hope that God's existence is easier to deal with," concluding that God is "ontologically necessary, but not logically necessary." He "does not assert that God's existence can be demonstrated in a logically coercive way (any more than God's non-existence can) but that theism makes more sense of the world, and of human experience, than does atheism." He cites in particular:

- The intelligibility of the universe: One would anticipate that evolutionary selection would produce hominid minds apt for coping with everyday experience, but that these minds should also be able to understand the subatomic world and general relativity goes far beyond anything of relevance to survival fitness. The mystery deepens when one recognises the proven fruitfulness of mathematical beauty as a guide to successful theory choice.
- The anthropic fine tuning of the universe: He quotes with approval Freeman Dyson, who said "the more I examine the universe and the details of its architecture, the more evidence I find that the universe in some sense must have known we were coming" and suggests there is a wide consensus amongst physicists that either there are a very large number of other universes in the Multiverse or that "there is just one universe which is the way it is in its anthropic fruitfulness because it is the expression of the purposive design of a Creator, who has endowed it with the finely tuned potentialty for life."
- A wider humane reality: He considers that theism offers a more persuasive account of ethical and aesthetic perceptions. He argues that it is difficult to accommodate the idea that "we have real moral knowledge" and that statements such as 'torturing children is wrong' are more than "simply social conventions of the societies within which they are uttered" within an atheistic or naturalistic world view. He also believes such a world view finds it hard to explain how "Something of lasting significance is glimpsed in the beauty of the natural world and the beauty of the fruits of human creativity."

=== On free will ===
Polkinghorne believes that

The well-known free will defence in relation to moral evil asserts that a world with a possibility of sinful people is better than one with perfectly programmed machines. The tale of human evil is such that one cannot make that assertion without a quiver, but I believe that it is true nevertheless. I have added to it the free-process defence, that a world allowed to make itself is better than a puppet theatre with a Cosmic Tyrant. I think that these two defences are opposite sides of the same coin, that our nature is inextricably linked with that of the physical world which has given us birth.

=== On creationism ===
Following the resignation of Michael Reiss, the director of education at the Royal Society—who had controversially argued that school pupils who believed in creationism should be used by science teachers to start discussions, rather than be rejected per se—Polkinghorne argued in The Times that "As a Christian believer I am, of course, a creationist in the proper sense of the term, for I believe that the mind and the purpose of a divine Creator lie behind the fruitful history and remarkable order of the universe which science explores. But I am certainly not a creationist in that curious North American sense, which implies interpreting Genesis 1 in a flat-footed literal way and supposing that evolution is wrong."

=== Critical reception ===
Nancy Frankenberry, Professor of Religion at Dartmouth College, has described Polkinghorne as the finest British theologian/scientist of our time, citing his work on the possible relationship between chaos theory and natural theology. Owen Gingerich, an astronomer and former Harvard professor, has called him a leading voice on the relationship between science and religion.

The British philosopher Simon Blackburn has criticized Polkinghorne for using primitive thinking and rhetorical devices instead of engaging in philosophy. When Polkinghorne argues that the minute adjustments of cosmological constants for life points towards an explanation beyond the scientific realm, Blackburn argues that this relies on a natural preference for explanation in terms of agency. Blackburn writes that he finished Polkinghorne's books in "despair at humanity's capacity for self-deception." Against this, Freeman Dyson called Polkinghorne's arguments on theology and natural science "polished and logically coherent." The novelist Simon Ings, writing in the New Scientist, said Polkinghorne's argument for the proposition that God is real is cogent and his evidence elegant.

Richard Dawkins, formerly Professor for Public Understanding of Science at Oxford, writes that the same three names of British scientists who are also sincerely religious crop up with the "likable familiarity of senior partners in a firm of Dickensian lawyers": Arthur Peacocke, Russell Stannard, and John Polkinghorne, all of whom have either won the Templeton Prize or are on its board of trustees. Dawkins writes that he is not so much bewildered by their belief in a cosmic lawgiver, but by their beliefs in the minutiae of Christianity, such as the resurrection and forgiveness of sins, and that such scientists, in Britain and in the US, are the subject of bemused bafflement among their peers. Polkinghorne responded that "debating with Dawkins is hopeless, because there's no give and take. He doesn't give you an inch. He just says no when you say yes." Nicholas Beale writes in Questions of Truth, which he co-authored with Polkinghorne, that he hopes Dawkins will be a bit less baffled once he reads it.

A. C. Grayling criticized the Royal Society for allowing its premises to be used in connection with the launch of Questions of Truth, describing it as a scandal, and suggesting that Polkinghorne had exploited his fellowship there to publicize a "weak, casuistical and tendentious pamphlet." After implying that the book's publisher, Westminster John Knox, was a self-publisher, Grayling went on to write that Polkinghorne and others were eager to see the credibility accorded to scientific research extended to religious perspectives through association.

In contrast to Grayling, science historian Edward B. Davis praises Questions of Truth, saying the book provides "the kind of technical information... that scientifically trained readers will appreciate—yet they can be read profitably by anyone interested in science and Christianity." Davis concludes, "It hasn't been easy to steer a middle course between fundamentalism and modernism, particularly on issues involving science. Polkinghorne has done that very successfully for a generation, and for this he ought to be both appreciated and emulated."

== Published works ==
Polkinghorne wrote 34 books, translated into 18 languages; 26 concern science and religion, often for a popular audience.

Science and religion

- The Polkinghorne Reader Archived 7 February 2017 at the Wayback Machine : Science, Faith, and the Search for Meaning (Edited by Thomas Jay Oord) (SPCK and Templeton Foundation Press, 2010) ISBN 1-59947-315-1 and ISBN 978-0-281-06053-5
- The Way the World Is: The Christian Perspective of a Scientist (1984 – revised 1992) ISBN 0-281-04597-6
- One World (SPCK/Princeton University Press 1987; Templeton Foundation Press, 2007) ISBN 978-1-59947-111-2
- Science and Creation (SPCK/New Science Library, 1989; Templeton Foundation Press, 2006) ISBN 978-1-59947-100-6
- Science and Providence (SPCK/New Science Library, 1989; Templeton Foundation Press, 2006) ISBN 978-1-932031-92-8
- Reason and Reality: Relationship Between Science and Theology (SPCK/Trinity Press International 1991) ISBN 978-0-281-04487-0
- Quarks, Chaos and Christianity (1994; Second edition SPCK/Crossroad 2005) ISBN 0-281-04779-0
- The Faith of a Physicist – published in the UK as Science and Christian Belief (1994) ISBN 0-691-03620-9
- Serious Talk: Science and Religion in Dialogue (Trinity Press International/SCM Press, 1996) ISBN 978-1-56338-109-6
- Scientists as Theologians (1996) ISBN 0-281-04945-9
- Beyond Science: The wider human context (CUP 1996) ISBN 978-0-521-57212-5
- Searching for Truth (Bible Reading Fellowship/Crossroad, 1996)
- Belief in God in an Age of Science (Yale University Press, 1998) ISBN 0-300-08003-4
- Science and Theology (SPCK/Fortress 1998) ISBN 0-8006-3153-6
- The End of the World and the Ends of God (Trinity Press International, 2000) with Michael Welker
- Traffic in Truth: Exchanges Between Sciences and Theology (Canterbury Press/Fortress, 2000) ISBN 978-0-8006-3579-4
- Faith, Science and Understanding (2000) SPCK/Yale University Press ISBN 0-300-08372-6
- The Work of Love: Creation as Kenosis editor, with contributors including Ian Barbour, Sarah Coakley, George Ellis, Jurgen Moltmann and Keith Ward (SPCK/Eerdmans 2001) ISBN 0-281-05372-3 / ISBN 0-8028-4885-0
- The God of Hope and the End of the World (Yale University Press, 2002) ISBN 0-300-09211-3
- The Archbishop's School of Christianity and Science (York Courses, 2003) ISBN 0954054385
- 'Science and Christian Faith' (Conversation on CD with Canon John Young. York Courses)
- Living with Hope (SPCK/Westminster John Knox Press, 2003)
- Science and the Trinity: The Christian Encounter With Reality (2004) ISBN 0-300-10445-6 (a particularly accessible summary of his thought)
- Exploring Reality: The Intertwining of Science & Religion (SPCK 2005) ISBN 0-300-11014-6
- Quantum Physics & Theology: An Unexpected Kinship (SPCK 2007) ISBN 978-0-281-05767-2
- From Physicist to Priest, an Autobiography SPCK 2007 ISBN 978-0-281-05915-7
- Theology in the Context of Science SPCK 2008 ISBN 978-0-281-05916-4
- Questions of Truth: Fiftyone Responses to Questions about God, Science and Belief, with Nicholas Beale; foreword by Antony Hewish (Westminster John Knox 2009) ISBN 978-0-664-23351-8
- Reason and Reality: The Relationship Between Science and Theology (2011) SPCK ISBN 978-0-281-06400-7
- Science and Religion in Quest of Truth (2011) SPCK ISBN 978-0-281-06412-0
- 'Hawking, Dawkins and GOD' (2012) (Conversation on CD with Canon John Young. York Courses)
- What Can We Hope For? (Sam&Sam, 2019) with Patrick Miles ISBN 978-1-9999676-1-1

Science

- The Analytic S-Matrix (CUP 1966, jointly with RJ Eden, PV Landshoff and DI Olive)
- The Particle Play (W.H. Freeman, 1979)
- Models of High Energy Processes (CUP 1980)
- The Quantum World (Longmans/Princeton University Press, 1985; Penguin 1986; Templeton Foundation Press 2007) ISBN 978-0-691-02388-5
- Rochester Roundabout: The Story of High Energy Physics (New York, Longman, 1989) ISBN 978-0-582-05011-2
- Quantum Theory: A Very Short Introduction (2002) OUP ISBN 0-19-280252-6
- Meaning in Mathematics (2011) OUP (edited, with contributions from Timothy Gowers, Roger Penrose, Marcus du Sautoy and others) ISBN 978-0-19-960505-7

Chapters

- "The Trinity and Scientific Theology" in The Blackwell Companion to Science and Christianity, J.B. Stump and Alan G. Padgett (eds.), (Wiley-Blackwell, 2012)
- On Space and Time (CUP 2008) along with Andrew Taylor, Shahn Majid, Roger Penrose, Alain Connes and Michael Heller ISBN 978-0-521-88926-1
- Spiritual Information: 100 Perspectives on Science and Religion (Templeton Foundation Press, 2005) ed Charles Harper ISBN 1-932031-73-1
- Creation, Law and Probability (Fortress Press 2008) ed Fraser Watts with Peter Harrison, George Ellis, Philip Clayton, Michael Ruse, Nancey Murphy, John Bowker & others ISBN 978-0-8006-6278-3
- "Physical Processes, Quantum Events, and Divine Agency," in Quantum Mechanics: Scientific Perspectives on Divine Action, Russell, R.J., Clayton, P., Wegter-McNelly, K., Polkinghorne, J. (eds.), (VATICAN: Vatican Observatory, 2001)

== See also ==
- Double-aspect theory
- List of Christians in science and technology
- List of scholars on the relationship between religion and science

Academic offices
Preceded by Ronald Oxburgh	President of Queens' College, Cambridge; 1988–1996	Succeeded by Lord Eatwell
Preceded by Annemarie Schimmel	Gifford Lecturer at the University of Edinburgh; 1993–1994	Succeeded by G. A. Cohen
Preceded by	Terry Lecturer; 1996–1997	Succeeded by David Hartman
Professional and academic associations
New office	President of the International; Society for Science and Religion; 2002–2004	Succeeded by George F. R. Ellis
Awards
Preceded by Arthur Peacocke	Templeton Prize; 2002	Succeeded by Holmes Rolston III
