= The Life of the Cosmos =

Book by Lee Smolin

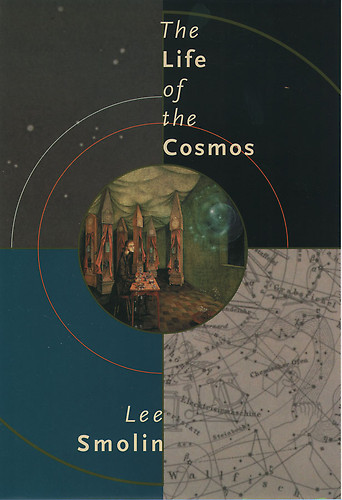
- Cover of the hardcover edition
- Author: Lee Smolin
- Language: English
- Subjects: Physics, Fecund universes
- Publisher: Oxford University Press
- Publication date: January 1, 1997
- Publication place: United States
- Media type: Print
- Pages: 370 pp.
- ISBN: 0195126645
- Followed by: Three Roads to Quantum Gravity (2001)

The Life of the Cosmos is the debut non-fiction book by American theoretical physicist Lee Smolin. The book was initially published on January 1, 1997, by Oxford University Press.

== Overview ==
In the book, Smolin details his fecund universes which applies the principle of natural selection to the birth of universes. Smolin posits that the collapse of black holes could lead to the creation of a new universe. This daughter universe would have fundamental constants and parameters similar to that of the parent universe though with some changes, providing for both inheritance and mutations as required by natural selection. However, while there is no direct analogue to Darwinian selective pressures, it is theorised that a universe with "unsuccessful" parameters will reach heat death before being able to reproduce, meaning that certain universal parameters become more likely than others.

== Review ==
A staff-written review from popular-science publisher Jupiter Scientific said of the book:

Is cosmological natural selection a theory? Yes, because it is testable. The theory predicts that Nature's parameters should be optimized for black hole production. Hence if one changes a coupling constant or a particle mass, the number of black holes should decrease. Theorists can analyze the effects of such a variation through calculations and computer simulations. Unfortunately, it is currently quite difficult to perform such an analysis because a change in a parameter affects the Universe in many disparate ways. Consider varying Newton's gravitational constant, for example. The rate of expansion of the Universe, the collapsing processes that build stars, stellar evolutions and supernova production would all change. There are about 20 parameters that can be varied. Since each may be increased or decreased, there are about 40 tests of the cosmological natural selection principle. The chances that Smolin's theory can accidentally survive all 40 tests is 1 in 2^40 or about 1 in a trillion. The Life of the Cosmos is well written in a highly intellectual style. For example, here are some sentences from a typical paragraph: "... If we were interested only in feeling better about ourselves, we might be happy to jump from vitalism to a kind of pantheism according to which life exists because the universe is itself alive. But our goal should be more than inventing a story that explains what we are doing in the universe .... What is needed is a deeper understanding of what both life and the universe are that allows us to comprehend why it is natural to find one inhabited by the other."

== See also ==
- Quantum mechanics

=== Related books ===
- The Trouble With Physics
- Three Roads to Quantum Gravity
- The Road to Reality
- The Elegant Universe
- The Fabric of the Cosmos
- Warped Passages
