= Djordje Minic =

American physicist (born 1964)

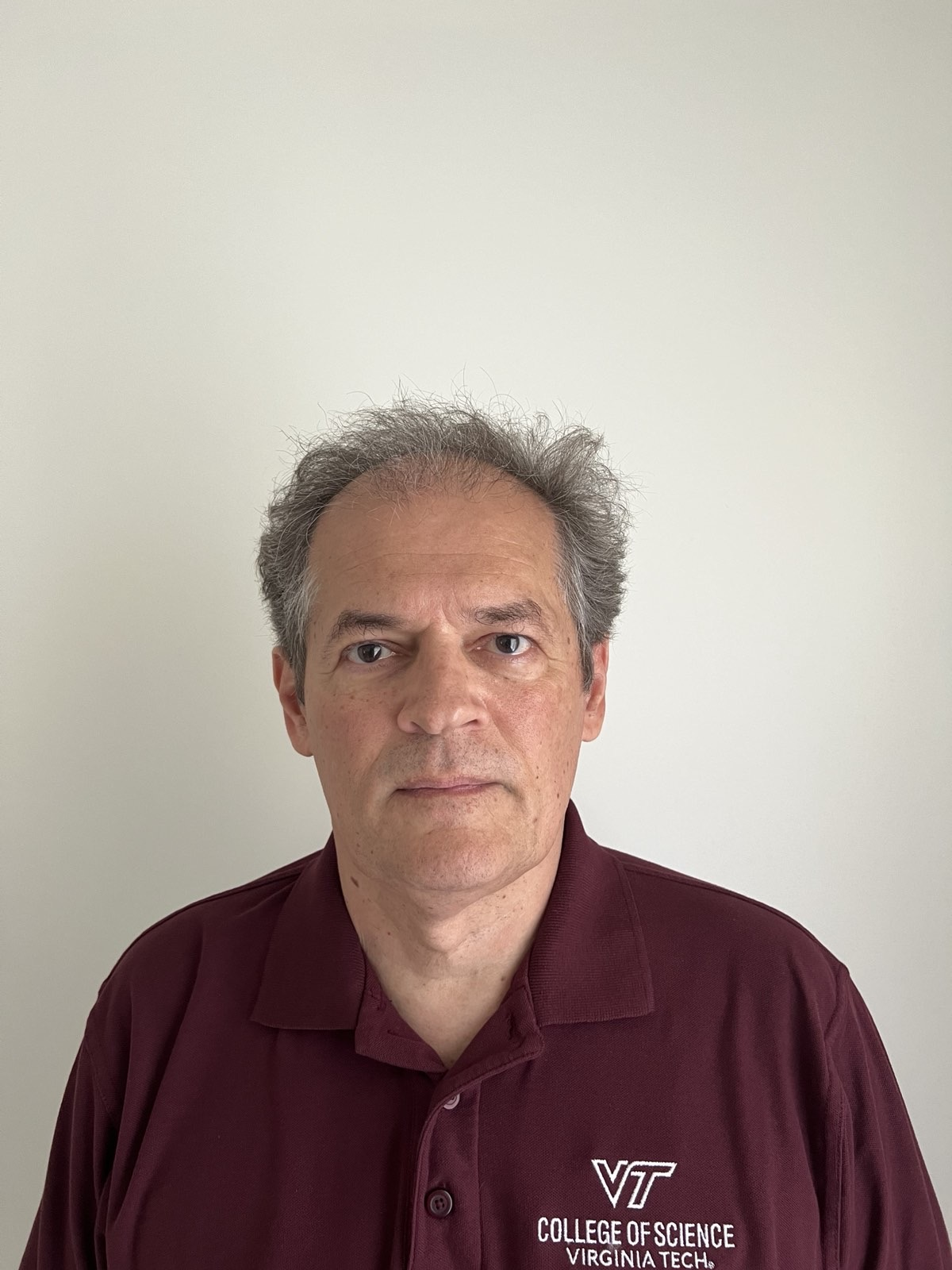
Djordje Minic

Djordje Minic (born 23 April 1964) is an American physicist of Yugoslav descent. His main subject of research is quantum physics. He graduated from the Faculty of Electrical Engineering in Belgrade in 1988, and received a PhD in Physics in 1993, at the University of Texas, Austin in the group of Steven Weinberg and Joseph Polchinski.

He conducted postdoctoral research at The City College of New York, The University of Chicago, The Pennsylvania State University and at the Center for Theoretical Physics at the California Institute of Technology.

In 2001, he relocated to Blacksburg, Virginia, where he currently resides and serves as a professor at Virginia Polytechnic Institute and State University.

His primary research interests lie at the intersection of quantum gravity, string theory, and quantum chromodynamics.

In collaboration with Robert Leigh and Laurent Freidel, Professor Minic co-proposed the metastring theory, which introduces a novel formulation of quantum gravity and modular spacetime.

He also actively collaborates with Tristan Hübsch, Per Berglund, David Mattingly, and Andrew Geraci.

In recognition of his contributions to theoretical physics he has received the Buchalter Cosmology Prize (2nd place, 2018), the Marko Jaric Prize, also known as The Serbian Nobel Prize in Physics, and Second Prize in the 2021 Essay Competition of the Gravity Research Foundation. Additionally, he is a foreign member of the Serbian Academy of Nonlinear Sciences.

Minic authored the book “In Search of Another Miraculous Year” (published in Belgrade, Serbia, in 2005) and co-authored the book ‘“The Weight of Quantum: Quantum Theory and the Structure of Physics” (published on 21 July 2026) with Tristan Hübsch.
