= Andrei Linde =

Russian-American theoretical physicist

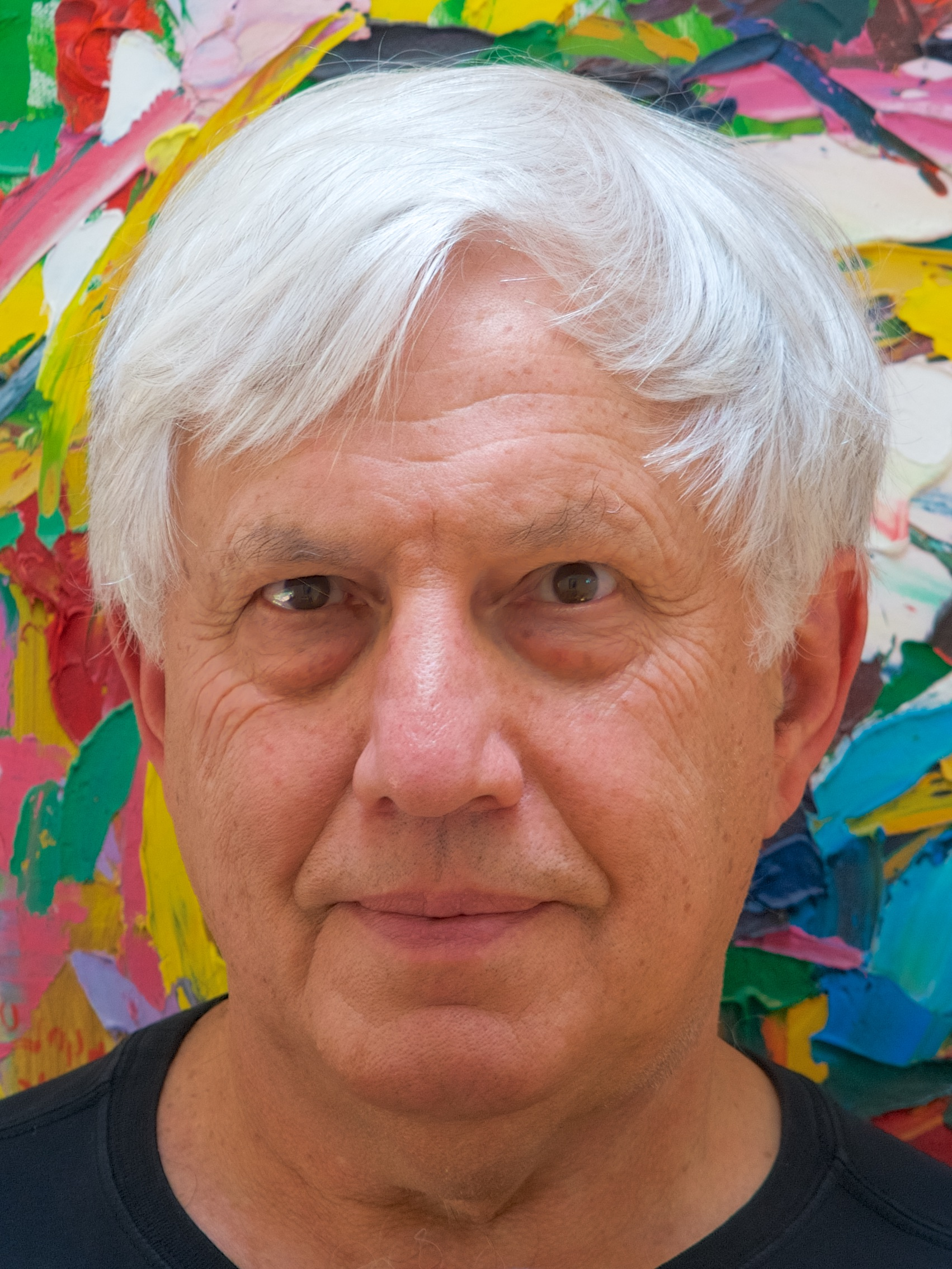
- Linde in 2018
- Born: Andrei Dmitriyevich Linde; March 2, 1948 (age 78); Moscow, Russian SFSR, Soviet Union
- Education: Moscow State University
- Known for: Work on cosmic inflation KKLT mechanism
- Spouse: Renata Kallosh
- Scientific career
- Fields: Theoretical physics Physical cosmology
- Workplaces: Lebedev Physical Institute; CERN; Stanford University
- Doctoral advisor: David Kirzhnits

Andrei Dmitriyevich Linde (Russian: Андрей Дмитриевич Линде) is a Russian-American theoretical physicist and the Harald Trap Friis Professor of Physics at Stanford University.

== Inflationary multiverse and eternal chaotic inflation ==
Linde and his Stanford colleague Vitaly Vanchurin calculated the number of all possible universes, to be about $10^{10^{16}}$ if we do not consider the fact that humans as observers are limited in their ability to distinguish more universes. If this is taken into account, there could be as many as $10^{10^{10^{7}}}$ universes. By analyzing the slow-roll inflation mechanism that initially generated the quantum fluctuations, the scientists could estimate the number of resulting universes at $10^{10^{10^{7}}}$.

== Inflation and string theory ==
One of the main challenges of this theory is to find the probability of living in each of these different parts of the universe. However, once string theory is invoked, it is extremely difficult to return to the previous picture of a single universe. In order to do so, one would need to prove that only one of the many vacua of string theory is actually possible, and to propose an alternative solution of the many problems which can be solved by using the anthropic cosmological principle in the context of the theory of inflationary multiverse.,

Linde continues his work on the theory of inflationary multiverse. In particular, Renata Kallosh and Andrei Linde, together with their collaborators, developed a theory of cosmological attractors. This is a broad class of versions of inflationary cosmology which provide one of the best fits to the latest observational data.

== Honors and awards ==
He was a co-recipient, with Alan Guth and Alexei Starobinsky, of the Kavli Prize awarded by the Norwegian Academy of Science and Letters.

== Personal life ==
Linde is married to Renata Kallosh. They have two sons.

== Political positions ==
In February–March 2022, he signed an open letter by Russian scientists condemning the 2022 Russian invasion of Ukraine, and another open letter by Breakthrough Prize laureates with the same message.
