= Relative locality =

Hypothetical phenomenon

Relative locality is a proposed physical phenomenon in which different observers would disagree on whether two space-time events are coincident. This is in contrast to special relativity and general relativity in which different observers may disagree on whether two distant events occur at the same time but if an observer infers that two events are at the same spacetime position then all observers will agree.

When a light signal exchange procedure is used to infer spacetime coordinates of distant events from the travel time of photons, information about the photon's energy is discarded with the assumption that the frequency of light doesn't matter. It is also usually assumed that distant observers construct the same spacetime. This assumption of absolute locality implies that momentum space is flat. However research into quantum gravity has indicated that momentum space might be curved which would imply relative locality. To regain an absolute arena for invariance one would combine spacetime and momentum space into a phase space.
