= LHX2 =

Protein-coding gene in the species Homo sapiens

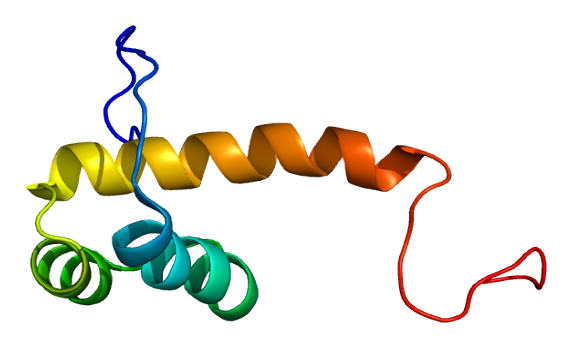

Identifiers
- Aliases: LHX2, LH2, hLhx2, LIM homeobox 2
- External IDs: OMIM: 603759; MGI: 96785; GeneCards: LHX2

Gene location (Human)
Chr.	Chromosome 9 (human)
Band	9q33.3	Start	124,001,670 bp
Band	9q33.3	End	124,033,301 bp

Gene location (Mouse)
Chr.	Chromosome 2 (mouse)
Band	2|2 B	Start	38,229,293 bp
Band	2|2 B	End	38,259,745 bp
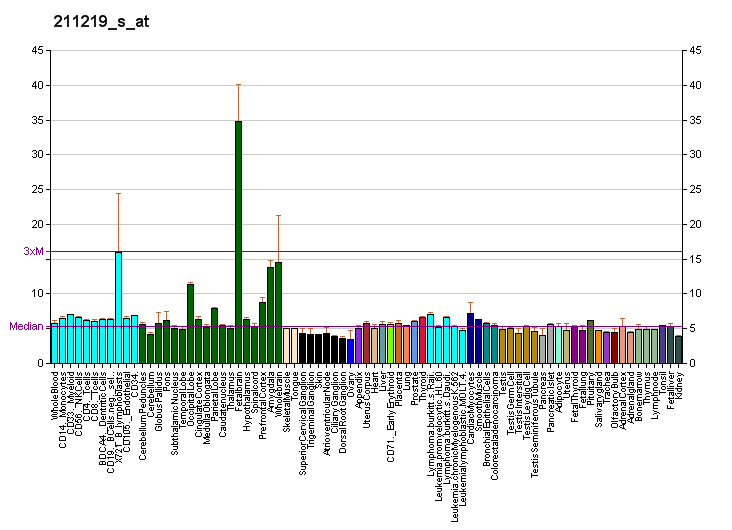

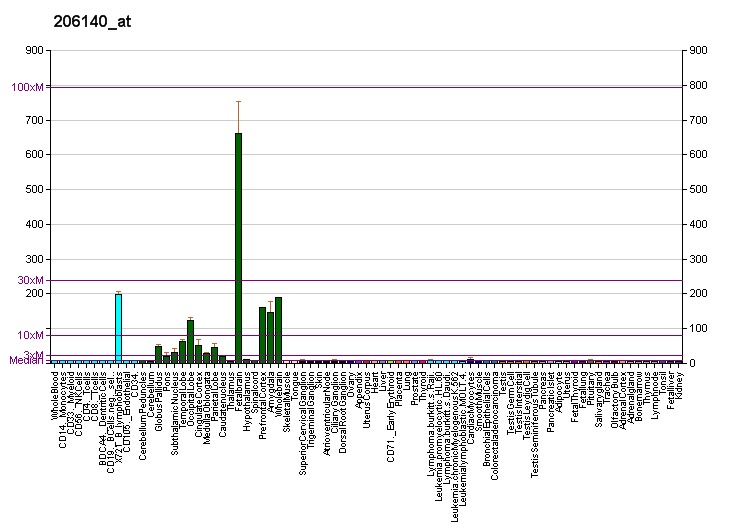
RNA expression pattern
Bgee	Human / Mouse (ortholog); Top expressed in: ventricular zone; hair follicle; ganglionic eminence; sperm; retinal pigment epithelium; endothelial cell; entorhinal cortex; middle temporal gyrus; Brodmann area 23; amygdala / Top expressed in: ventricular zone; olfactory epithelium; ganglionic eminence; lip; dentate gyrus of hippocampal formation granule cell; septum transversum; barrel cortex; hand; hippocampus proper; hepatic diverticulum; More reference expression data
BioGPS	More reference expression data
Gene ontology
Molecular function	metal ion binding; sequence-specific DNA binding; chromatin binding; DNA binding; RNA polymerase II cis-regulatory region sequence-specific DNA binding; DNA-binding transcription activator activity, RNA polymerase II-specific; DNA-binding transcription factor activity, RNA polymerase II-specific; transcription factor binding; RNA polymerase II transcription regulatory region sequence-specific DNA binding
Cellular component	nucleus; intracellular anatomical structure
Biological process	negative regulation of transcription regulatory region DNA binding; mesoderm development; telencephalon development; neural tube closure; retina development in camera-type eye; cerebral cortex development; transcription, DNA-templated; axon guidance; axon extension; hair follicle development; maintenance of epithelial cell apical/basal polarity; neurogenesis; brain development; olfactory bulb development; nervous system development; dorsal/ventral pattern formation; positive regulation of transcription, DNA-templated; regulation of transcription, DNA-templated; positive regulation of transcription by RNA polymerase II; neuron differentiation; anatomical structure formation involved in morphogenesis; telencephalon regionalization; transcription by RNA polymerase II; negative regulation of gene expression, epigenetic; negative regulation of neurogenesis; positive regulation of neural precursor cell proliferation
Sources:Amigo / QuickGO
Orthologs
Databases	NCBI: entry; OMA: entry
Species	Human	Mouse
Entrez	9355	16870
Ensembl	ENSG00000106689	ENSMUSG00000000247
UniProt	P50458	Q9Z0S2
RefSeq (mRNA)	NM_004789	NM_001290646; NM_010710
RefSeq (protein)	NP_004780	NP_001277575; NP_034840
Location (UCSC)	Chr 9: 124 – 124.03 Mb	Chr 2: 38.23 – 38.26 Mb
PubMed search
- Wikidata
View/Edit Human	View/Edit Mouse

LIM/homeobox 2 protein (LHX2) is a protein that in humans is encoded by the LHX2 gene and is part of the LIM gene family. LHX2, like other members of the LIM-homeobox gene family, regulates developmental processes like tissue patterning, cell fate determination and differentiation.

== Structure ==
LHX2 as part of the LIM gene family, it encodes for proteins with two N-terminal zinc-finger-like motifs called LIM domains and a homeobox domain. Due to the presence of the LIM domains which bind to zinc, LHX2 can form complexes like with LDB1 in mammals or binding with DNA through the HOX domain to activate genes.

== Functions ==
The encoded protein may function as a transcriptional regulator. The protein can recapitulate or rescue phenotypes in Drosophila caused by a related protein, suggesting conservation of function during evolution.

The LIM domain of LHX2 has been shown to interact with MRG1 which further binds to CITED2 and enhances transcriptional activation of the α-subunit gene of the glycoprotein hormones.
