= Peter Woit =

American theoretical physicist (b. 1957)

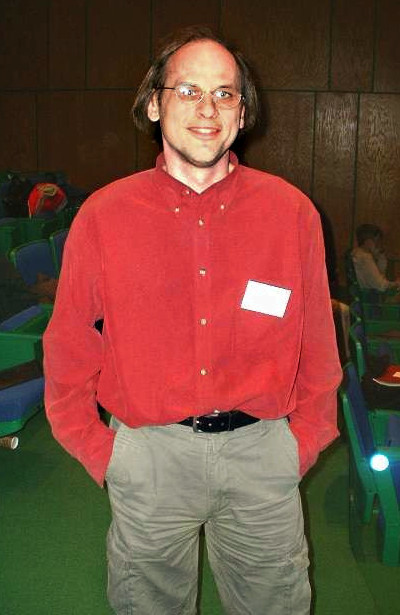
- Woit in 2005
- Born: September 11, 1957 (age 68)
- Education: Harvard University (BA, MA); Princeton University (PhD)
- Scientific career
- Fields: Theoretical physics
- Workplaces: Columbia University
- Doctoral advisor: Curtis Callan
- Website: math.columbia.edu/~woit/

Peter Woit (/ˈwɔɪt/; born September 11, 1957) is a Latvian-American mathematician who works in twistor theory. He works in the mathematics department at Columbia University. A critic of string theory, Woit has published the book Not Even Wrong (2006) and writes a blog of the same name.

== Career ==
Woit graduated in 1979 from Harvard University with bachelor's and master's degrees in physics. He obtained his PhD in particle physics from Princeton University in 1985, followed by postdoctoral work in theoretical physics at State University of New York at Stony Brook and mathematics at the Mathematical Sciences Research Institute (MSRI) in Berkeley. He spent four years as an assistant professor at Columbia. He now holds a permanent position in the mathematics department, as a senior lecturer.

Woit is a U.S. citizen and also has a Latvian passport. His father was born in Riga and became exiled with his own parents at the beginning of the Soviet occupation of Latvia.

== Criticism of string theory ==
Woit is critical of string theory on the grounds that it lacks testable predictions and is promoted with public money despite its failures so far, and has authored both scientific papers and popular polemics on this topic. His writings claim that excessive media attention and funding of this endeavor, which he considers speculative, risks undermining public faith in the freedom of scientific research. His moderated weblog on string theory and other topics is titled "Not Even Wrong", a derogatory term for scientifically useless arguments coined by Wolfgang Pauli.

For the last eighteen years particle theory has been dominated by a single approach to the unification of the Standard Model interactions and quantum gravity. This line of thought has hardened into a new orthodoxy that postulates an unknown fundamental supersymmetric theory involving strings and other degrees of freedom with characteristic scale around the Planck length. […] It is a striking fact that there is absolutely no evidence whatsoever for this complex and unattractive conjectural theory. There is not even a serious proposal for what the dynamics of the fundamental 'M-theory' is supposed to be or any reason at all to believe that its dynamics would produce a vacuum state with the desired properties. The sole argument generally given to justify this picture of the world is that perturbative string theories have a massless spin two mode and thus could provide an explanation of gravity, if one ever managed to find an underlying theory for which perturbative string theory is the perturbative expansion.

=== "The String Wars" ===
A discussion in 2006 took place between University of California, Santa Barbara physicists at the Kavli Institute for Theoretical Physics and science journalist George Johnson about the controversy caused by the books of Lee Smolin (The Trouble with Physics) and Woit (Not Even Wrong). The meeting was titled "The String Wars".

== Selected publications ==
- 1988, "Supersymmetric quantum mechanics, spinors and the standard model," Nuclear Physics B303: 329-42.doi:10.1016/0550-3213(88)90185-X
- 1990, "Topological quantum theories and representation theory" in Ling-Lie Chau and Werner Nahm, eds., Differential Geometric Methods in Theoretical Physics: Physics and Geometry, Proceedings of NATO Advanced Research Workshop. Plenum Press: 533-45.doi:10.1007/978-1-4684-9148-7_54
- 2006. Not Even Wrong: The Failure of String Theory & the Continuing Challenge to Unify the Laws of Physics. ISBN 0-224-07605-1 (Jonathan Cape), ISBN 0-465-09275-6 (Basic Books)
- 2017 Quantum Theory, Groups and Representations Springer International Publishing, Hardcover ISBN 978-3-319-64610-7, eBook ISBN 978-3-319-64612-1, doi:10.1007/978-3-319-64612-1

== See also ==
- The Trouble with Physics
- Lee Smolin
