= Holographic principle =

Principle in theoretical physics

The holographic principle is a property of string theories and a supposed property of quantum gravity that states that the description of a volume of space can be thought of as encoded on a lower-dimensional boundary to the region – such as a light-like boundary like a gravitational horizon. First proposed by Gerard 't Hooft in 1993, it was given a precise string theoretic interpretation by Leonard Susskind, who combined his ideas with previous ones of 't Hooft and Charles Thorn. Susskind said, "The three-dimensional world of ordinary experience—the universe filled with galaxies, stars, planets, houses, boulders, and people—is a hologram, an image of reality coded on a distant two-dimensional surface." As pointed out by Raphael Bousso, Thorn observed in 1978 that string theory admits a lower-dimensional description from which gravity emerges in what would now be called a holographic way. The prime example of holography is the AdS/CFT correspondence.

The holographic principle was inspired by the Bekenstein bound of black hole thermodynamics, which conjectures that the maximum entropy in any region scales with the radius squared, rather than cubed as might be expected. In the case of a black hole, the insight was that the information content of all the objects that have fallen into the hole might be entirely contained in surface fluctuations of the event horizon. The holographic principle resolves the black hole information paradox within the framework of string theory. However, there exist classical solutions to the Einstein equations that allow values of the entropy larger than those allowed by an area law (radius squared), hence in principle larger than those of a black hole. These are the so-called "Wheeler's bags of gold". The existence of such solutions conflicts with the holographic interpretation, and their effects in a quantum theory of gravity including the holographic principle are not yet fully understood.

== High-level summary ==
The physical universe is widely seen to be composed of "matter" and "energy". In his 2003 article published in Scientific American magazine, Jacob Bekenstein speculatively summarized a current trend started by John Archibald Wheeler, which suggests scientists may "regard the physical world as made of information, with energy and matter as incidentals". Bekenstein asks "Could we, as William Blake memorably penned, 'see a world in a grain of sand', or is that idea no more than 'poetic license'?", referring to the holographic principle.

=== Unexpected connection ===
Bekenstein's topical overview "A Tale of Two Entropies" describes potentially profound implications of Wheeler's trend, in part by noting a previously unexpected connection between the world of information theory and classical physics. This connection was first described shortly after the seminal 1948 papers of American applied mathematician Claude Shannon introduced today's most widely used measure of information content, now known as Shannon entropy. As an objective measure of the quantity of information, Shannon entropy has been enormously useful, as the design of all modern communications and data storage devices, from cellular phones to modems to hard disk drives and DVDs, rely on Shannon entropy.

In thermodynamics (the branch of physics dealing with heat), entropy is popularly described as a measure of the "disorder" in a physical system of matter and energy. In 1877, Austrian physicist Ludwig Boltzmann described it more precisely in terms of the number of distinct microscopic states that the particles composing a macroscopic "chunk" of matter could be in, while still "looking" like the same macroscopic "chunk". As an example, for the air in a room, its thermodynamic entropy would equal the logarithm of the count of all the ways that the individual gas molecules could be distributed in the room and all the ways they could be moving.

=== Energy, matter, and information equivalence ===
Shannon's efforts to find a way to quantify the information contained in, for example, a telegraph message, led him unexpectedly to a formula with the same form as Boltzmann's. In an article in the August 2003 issue of Scientific American titled "Information in the Holographic Universe", Bekenstein summarizes that "Thermodynamic entropy and Shannon entropy are conceptually equivalent: the number of arrangements that are counted by Boltzmann entropy reflects the amount of Shannon information one would need to implement any particular arrangement" of matter and energy. The only salient difference between the thermodynamic entropy of physics and Shannon's entropy of information is in the units of measure; the former is expressed in units of energy divided by temperature, the latter in essentially dimensionless "bits" of information.

The holographic principle states that the entropy of ordinary mass (not just black holes) is also proportional to surface area and not volume; that volume itself is illusory and the universe is really a hologram which is isomorphic to the information "inscribed" on the surface of its boundary.

== AdS/CFT correspondence ==
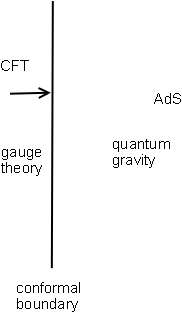
Conjectured relationship of adS/CFT

The anti-de Sitter/conformal field theory correspondence, sometimes called Maldacena duality named after the Argentinian physicist Juan Maldacena (after ref.) or gauge/gravity duality, is a conjectured relationship between two kinds of physical theories. On one side are anti-de Sitter spaces (AdS), which are used in theories of quantum gravity, formulated in terms of string theory or M-theory. On the other side of the correspondence are conformal field theories (CFT) which are quantum field theories (QFT), including theories similar to the Yang–Mills theories that describe elementary particles.

The duality represents a major advance in understanding of string theory and quantum gravity. This is because it provides a non-perturbative formulation of string theory with certain boundary conditions and because it is the most successful realization of the holographic principle.

It also provides a powerful toolkit for studying strongly coupled quantum field theories. Much of the usefulness of the duality results from a strong-weak duality: when the fields of the quantum field theory are strongly interacting, the ones in the gravitational theory are weakly interacting and thus more mathematically tractable. This fact has been used to study many aspects of nuclear and condensed matter physics by translating problems in those subjects into more mathematically tractable problems in string theory.

The AdS/CFT correspondence was first proposed by Juan Maldacena in late 1997. Important aspects of the correspondence were elaborated in articles by Steven Gubser, Igor Klebanov, and Alexander Markovich Polyakov, and by Edward Witten. By 2015, Maldacena's article had over 10,000 citations, becoming the most highly cited article in the field of high energy physics.

== Black hole entropy ==
An object with relatively high entropy is microscopically random, like a hot gas. A known configuration of classical fields has zero entropy: there is nothing random about electric and magnetic fields, or gravitational waves. Since black holes are exact solutions of Einstein's equations, they were thought not to have any entropy.

But Jacob Bekenstein noted that this leads to a violation of the second law of thermodynamics. If one throws a hot gas with entropy into a black hole, once it crosses the event horizon, the entropy would disappear. The random properties of the gas would no longer be seen once the black hole had absorbed the gas and settled down. One way of salvaging the second law is if black holes are in fact random objects with an entropy that increases by an amount greater than the entropy of the consumed gas.

Given a fixed volume, a black hole whose event horizon encompasses that volume should be the object with the highest amount of entropy. Otherwise, imagine something with a larger entropy, then by throwing more mass into that something, we obtain a black hole with less entropy, violating the second law.

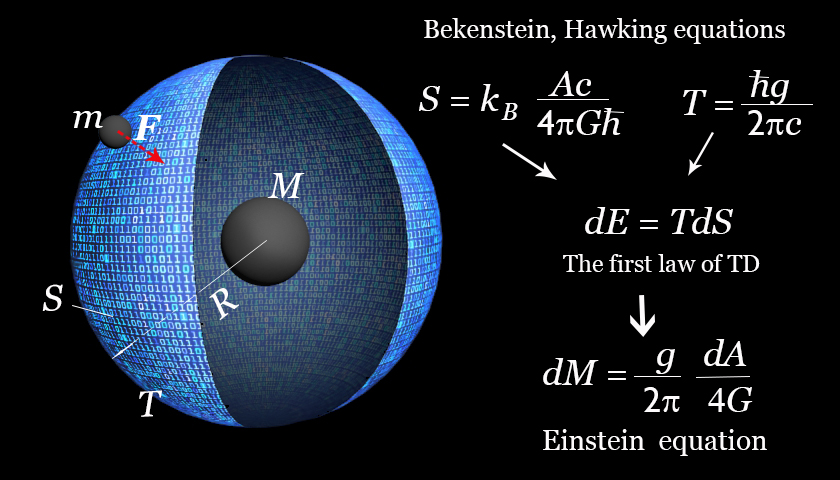
The illustration demonstrates the way of thinking of the entropic gravity, holographic principle, entropy distribution, and derivation of Einstein General Relativity equations from these considerations. The Einstein equation takes the form of the first law of thermodynamics when Bekenstein and Hawking equations are applied.

In a sphere of radius R, the entropy in a relativistic gas increases as the energy increases. The only known limit is gravitational; when there is too much energy, the gas collapses into a black hole. Bekenstein used this to put an upper bound on the entropy in a region of space, and the bound was proportional to the area of the region. He concluded that the black hole entropy is directly proportional to the area of the event horizon. Gravitational time dilation causes time, from the perspective of a remote observer, to stop at the event horizon. Due to the natural limit on maximum speed of motion, this prevents falling objects from crossing the event horizon no matter how close they get to it. Since any change in quantum state requires time to flow, all objects and their quantum information state stay imprinted on the event horizon. Bekenstein concluded that from the perspective of any remote observer, the black hole entropy is directly proportional to the area of the event horizon.

Stephen Hawking had shown earlier that the total horizon area of a collection of black holes always increases with time. The horizon is a boundary defined by light-like geodesics; it is those light rays that are just barely unable to escape. If neighboring geodesics start moving toward each other they eventually collide, at which point their extension is inside the black hole. So the geodesics are always moving apart, and the number of geodesics which generate the boundary, the area of the horizon, always increases. Hawking's result was called the second law of black hole thermodynamics, by analogy with the law of entropy increase.

At first, Hawking did not take the analogy too seriously. He argued that the black hole must have zero temperature, since black holes do not radiate and therefore cannot be in thermal equilibrium with any black body of positive temperature. Then he discovered that black holes do radiate. When heat is added to a thermal system, the change in entropy is the increase in mass–energy divided by temperature:

$${\rm d}S = \frac{{\rm\delta }M \ c^2}{T}.$$

(Here the term δM c^{2} is substituted for the thermal energy added to the system, generally by non-integrable random processes, in contrast to dS, which is a function of a few "state variables" only, i.e. in conventional thermodynamics only of the Kelvin temperature T and a few additional state variables, such as the pressure.)

If black holes have a finite entropy, they should also have a finite temperature. In particular, they would come to equilibrium with a thermal gas of photons. This means that black holes would not only absorb photons, but they would also have to emit them in the right amount to maintain detailed balance.

Time-independent solutions to field equations do not emit radiation, because a time-independent background conserves energy. Based on this principle, Hawking set out to show that black holes do not radiate. But, to his surprise, a careful analysis convinced him that they do, and in just the right way to come to equilibrium with a gas at a finite temperature. Hawking's calculation fixed the constant of proportionality at 1/4; the entropy of a black hole is one quarter its horizon area in Planck units.

The entropy is proportional to the logarithm of the number of microstates, the enumerated ways a system can be configured microscopically while leaving the macroscopic description unchanged. Black hole entropy is deeply puzzling – it says that the logarithm of the number of states of a black hole is proportional to the area of the horizon, not the volume in the interior.

There were attempts to generalize the entropy bound to more general spacetimes, notably through the Fischler–Susskind holographic bound. Later, Raphael Bousso generalized this to the covariant entropy bound based upon null hypersurfaces which works in any surface in any spacetimes.

== Black hole information paradox ==
Hawking's calculation suggested that the radiation which black holes emit is not related in any way to the matter that they absorb. The outgoing light rays start exactly at the edge of the black hole and spend a long time near the horizon, while the infalling matter only reaches the horizon much later. The infalling and outgoing mass/energy interact only when they cross. It is implausible that the outgoing state would be completely determined by some tiny residual scattering.

Hawking interpreted this to mean that when black holes absorb some photons in a pure state described by a wave function, they re-emit new photons in a thermal mixed state described by a density matrix. This would mean that quantum mechanics would have to be modified because, in quantum mechanics, states which are superpositions with probability amplitudes never become states which are probabilistic mixtures of different possibilities. (Note: except in the case of measurements, which the black hole should not be performing)

This idea was made more precise by Leonard Susskind, who had also been developing holography, largely independently. Susskind argued that the oscillation of the horizon of a black hole is a complete description (Note: "Complete description" means all the primary qualities. For example, John Locke (and before him Robert Boyle) determined these to be size, shape, motion, number, and solidity. Such secondary quality information as color, aroma, taste and sound, or internal quantum state is not information that is implied to be preserved in the surface fluctuations of the event horizon. (See however "path integral quantization")) of both the infalling and outgoing matter, because the world-sheet theory of string theory was just such a holographic description. While short strings have zero entropy, he could identify long highly excited string states with ordinary black holes. This was a deep advance because it revealed that strings have a classical interpretation in terms of black holes.

This work showed that the black hole information paradox is resolved when quantum gravity is described in an unusual string-theoretic way assuming the string-theoretical description is complete, unambiguous and non-redundant. The space-time in quantum gravity would emerge as an effective description of the theory of oscillations of a lower-dimensional black-hole horizon, and suggest that any black hole with appropriate properties, not just strings, would serve as a basis for a description of string theory.

In 1995, Susskind, along with collaborators Tom Banks, Willy Fischler, and Stephen Shenker, presented a formulation of the new M-theory using a holographic description in terms of charged point black holes, the D0 branes of type IIA string theory. The matrix theory they proposed was first suggested as a description of two branes in eleven-dimensional supergravity by Bernard de Wit, Jens Hoppe, and Hermann Nicolai. The later authors reinterpreted the same matrix models as a description of the dynamics of point black holes in particular limits. Holography allowed them to conclude that the dynamics of these black holes give a complete non-perturbative formulation of M-theory. In 1997, Juan Maldacena gave the first holographic descriptions of a higher-dimensional object, the 3+1-dimensional type IIB membrane, which resolved a long-standing problem of finding a string description which describes a gauge theory. These developments simultaneously explained how string theory is related to some forms of supersymmetric quantum field theories.

== Limit on information density ==
The Bekenstein-Hawking entropy of a black hole is proportional to the surface area of the black hole as expressed in Planck units.

Information content is defined as the logarithm of the reciprocal of the probability that a system is in a specific microstate, and the information entropy of a system is the expected value of the system's information content. This definition of entropy is equivalent to the standard Gibbs entropy used in classical physics. Applying this definition to a physical system leads to the conclusion that, for a given energy in a given volume, there is an upper limit to the density of information (the Bekenstein bound) about the whereabouts of all the particles which compose matter in that volume. In particular, a given volume has an upper limit of information it can contain, at which point it will collapse into a black hole.

This suggests that matter itself cannot be subdivided infinitely many times and there must be an ultimate level of fundamental particles. As the degrees of freedom of a particle are the product of all the degrees of freedom of its sub-particles, were a particle to have infinite subdivisions into lower-level particles, the degrees of freedom of the original particle would be infinite, violating the maximal limit of entropy density. The holographic principle thus implies that the subdivisions must stop at some level.

The most rigorous realization of the holographic principle is the AdS/CFT correspondence by Juan Maldacena. However, J. David Brown and Marc Henneaux had rigorously proved in 1986, that the asymptotic symmetry of 2+1 dimensional gravity gives rise to a Virasoro algebra, whose corresponding quantum theory is a 2-dimensional conformal field theory.

== Experimental tests ==
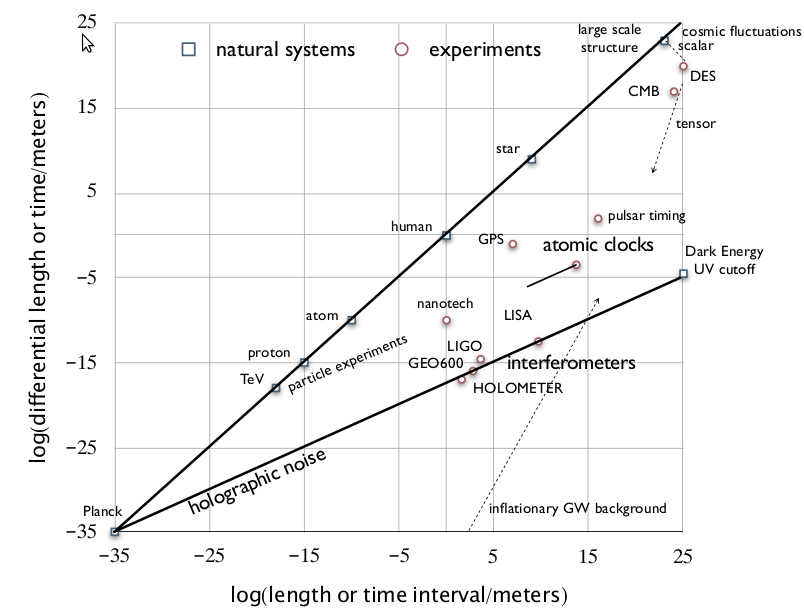
This plot shows the sensitivity of various experiments to fluctuations in space and time. Horizontal axis is the log of apparatus size (or duration times the speed of light), in meters; vertical axis is the log of the rms fluctuation amplitude in the same units. The lower left corner represents the Planck length or time. In these units, the size of the observable universe is about 26. Various physical systems and experiments are plotted. The "holographic noise" line represents the rms transverse holographic fluctuation amplitude on a given scale.

The Fermilab physicist Craig Hogan claims that the holographic principle would imply quantum fluctuations in spatial position that would lead to apparent background noise or "holographic noise" measurable at gravitational wave detectors, in particular GEO 600. However these claims have not been widely accepted, or cited, among quantum gravity researchers and appear to be in direct conflict with string theory calculations.

Analyses in 2011 of measurements of gamma ray burst GRB 041219A in 2004 by the INTEGRAL space observatory launched in 2002 by the European Space Agency, shows that Craig Hogan's noise is absent down to a scale of 10^{−48} meters, as opposed to the scale of 10^{−35} meters predicted by Hogan, and the scale of 10^{−16} meters found in measurements of the GEO 600 instrument. Research continued at Fermilab under Hogan as of 2013.

Jacob Bekenstein claimed to have found a way to test the holographic principle with a tabletop photon experiment.

== Celestial holography ==
In 2020, Andrew Strominger, the Harvard theoretical physicist who developed the dS/CFT correspondence said he believed an equivalence relation he introduced in his 2016 lecture series Lectures on the Infrared Structure of Gravity and Gauge Theory, the infrared triangle, proposed to constrain theories of quantum gravity, could be used to show that a holography of the universe is not limited to AdS space. This developed into the subfield of celestial holography, which seeks to reformulate QFTs and quantum gravity in asymptotically flat spacetimes in terms of a lower-dimensional CFT defined on the celestial sphere at null infinity. Strominger and others in the subfield aim to approach it as testable within real world physics using gravitational wave detection with LIGO or LISA.

In celestial holography, scattering amplitudes in four-dimensional flat spacetimes are related via Mellin transforms over external particle energies to correlation functions of conformal primary operators in the associated celestial CFT. The central conjecture is that this correspondence provides a complete boundary description of the gravitational S-matrix in a flat Minkowski spacetime.

The Celestial Holography Initiative at Perimeter Institute for Theoretical Physics was founded in 2021 by Sabrina Pasterski to further the subfield. In 2023, the Simons Foundation entered into a collaboration with the initiative, of which Strominger is the director.

== See also ==
- Bekenstein bound
- Beyond black holes
- Bousso's holographic bound
- Brane cosmology
- Digital physics
- Entropic gravity
- Implicate and explicate order
- Quantum speed limit theorems
- Physical cosmology
- Quantum foam
