= Daniel L. Jafferis =

American theoretical physicist

Daniel Louis Jafferis (born July 23, 1983, in West Haven, Connecticut) is an American theoretical physicist, known for his research on quantum gravity, supersymmetric quantum field theory, and string theory.

== Education and career ==
Jafferis was privately home-schooled and at age 14 began his studies at Yale University, where he graduated with a bachelor's degree in mathematics and physics in 2001. He received his PhD in physics from Harvard University in 2007. His PhD thesis Topological string theory from D-brane bound states was supervised by Cumrun Vafa. Jafferis was from 2007 to 2010 a post-doctoral fellow at Rutgers University and from June 2010 to March 2011 a temporary member at the Institute for Advanced Study. He is a tenured professor of physics at Harvard University.

In 2008, Jafferis was, with Ofer Aharony, Oren Bergman, and Juan Maldacena, one of the developers of ABJM superconformal field theory, an AdS-CFT correspondence of superconformal (N=6) Chern-Simons theory in three dimensions to M-theory in $\mathrm{AdS}_4 \, \times \, S^7$, described by M2-branes, the solutions of eleven-dimensional supergravity having three-dimensional world-volume – in $\mathrm{AdS}_4$ (four-dimensional anti-DeSitter space).

In 2012, with Silviu Pufu, Benjamin Safdi, and Igor Klebanov, he formulated a conjecture (conjectural F-theorem) about the behavior of the free energy F in renormalization group flows of a three-dimensional supersymmetric quantum field theory.

In 2016, with Ping Gao and Aron C. Wall, Jafferis proposed a mechanism for traversable wormholes without exotic matter with a description mathematically equivalent to quantum teleportation.

== Awards and honors ==
In 2012 Jafferis received the Henry Primakoff Award of the American Physical Society for "construction and study of three-dimensionals supersymmetric quantum field theories." In 2019 he was awarded the New Horizons in Physics Prize for "fundamental insights about quantum information, quantum field theory, and gravity."

== Selected publications ==
- Aharony, Ofer; Bergman, Oren; Jafferis, Daniel Louis; Maldacena, Juan (2008). "𝒩 = 6 superconformal Chern-Simons-matter theories, M2-branes and their gravity duals". Journal of High Energy Physics (10): 091. arXiv:0806.1218. doi:10.1088/1126-6708/2008/10/091.
- Jafferis, Daniel Louis; Tomasiello, Alessandro (2008). "A simple class of 𝒩 = 3 gauge/Gravity duals". Journal of High Energy Physics (10): 101. arXiv:0808.0864. doi:10.1088/1126-6708/2008/10/101.
- Aharony, Ofer; Bergman, Oren; Jafferis, Daniel Louis (2008). "Fractional M2-branes". Journal of High Energy Physics (11): 043. arXiv:0807.4924. Bibcode:2008JHEP...11..043A. doi:10.1088/1126-6708/2008/11/043.
- Jafferis, Daniel L.; Klebanov, Igor R.; Pufu, Silviu S.; Safdi, Benjamin R. (2011). "Towards the F-theorem: N=2 field theories on the three-sphere". Journal of High Energy Physics (6): 102. arXiv:1103.1181. Bibcode:2011JHEP...06..102J. doi:10.1007/JHEP06(2011)102.
- Jafferis, Daniel L. (2012). "The exact superconformal R-symmetry extremizes Z". Journal of High Energy Physics (5): 159. arXiv:1012.3210. Bibcode:2012JHEP...05..159J. doi:10.1007/JHEP05(2012)159.
- Jafferis, Daniel L.; Pufu, Silviu S. (2014). "Exact results for five-dimensional superconformal field theories with gravity duals". Journal of High Energy Physics (5): 32. arXiv:1207.4359. Bibcode:2014JHEP...05..032J. doi:10.1007/JHEP05(2014)032.
- Guarino, Adolfo; Jafferis, Daniel L.; Varela, Oscar (2015). "String Theory Origin of Dyonic 𝒩 = 8 Supergravity and Its Chern-Simons Duals". Physical Review Letters. 115 (9) 091601. arXiv:1504.08009. Bibcode:2015PhRvL.115i1601G. doi:10.1103/PhysRevLett.115.091601. PMID 26371639.
- Jafferis, Daniel L.; Lewkowycz, Aitor; Maldacena, Juan; Suh, S. Josephine (2016). "Relative entropy equals bulk relative entropy". Journal of High Energy Physics (6): 4. arXiv:1512.06431. Bibcode:2016JHEP...06..004J. doi:10.1007/JHEP06(2016)004.
- Jafferis, Daniel L.; Suh, S. Josephine (2016). "The gravity duals of modular Hamiltonians". Journal of High Energy Physics (9): 68. arXiv:1412.8465. Bibcode:2016JHEP...09..068J. doi:10.1007/JHEP09(2016)068.
- Gao, Ping; Jafferis, Daniel Louis; Wall, Aron C. (2017). "Traversable wormholes via a double trace deformation". Journal of High Energy Physics (12): 151. arXiv:1608.05687. Bibcode:2017JHEP...12..151G. doi:10.1007/JHEP12(2017)151.
