= Horațiu Năstase =

Romanian physicist

- Born: Bucharest, Romania
- Education: State University of New York at Stony Brook
- Scientific career
- Fields: Physics
- Workplaces: São Paulo State University
- Thesis: Connections between supergravity and gauge theory from supersymmetry and string theory (2000)
- Doctoral advisor: Peter van Nieuwenhuizen

Horațiu Năstase is a Romanian physicist and professor in the string theory group at Instituto de Física Teórica of the São Paulo State University in São Paulo, Brazil.

He was born in Bucharest, Romania, and finished high school at the Nicolae Bălcescu High School (now Saint Sava National College). He did his undergraduate studies in the Physics Department of the University of Bucharest, graduating in 1995. His last year there he studied at the Niels Bohr Institute (NBI), Copenhagen University, with a scholarship which continued into the following year.

In 1996 he joined the Physics Department of the State University of New York at Stony Brook from which he received his PhD in May 2000, with thesis written under the direction of Peter van Nieuwenhuizen. From 2000 to 2002 he was a postdoc at the Institute for Advanced Study in Princeton, after which he was an assistant research professor at Brown University until 2006. From 2007 to 2009 he was an assistant professor at the Global Edge Institute of the Tokyo Institute of Technology in Japan. Since 2010, Năstase holds a permanent position as assistant professor at IFT-UNESP in Brazil.

Năstase attracted some media attention in 2005 by arguing that string theory could be tested by the Relativistic Heavy Ion Collider, through the AdS/CFT correspondence. He is also known for his work in 2002 with David Berenstein and Juan Maldacena to investigate the duality between strings on pp-wave spacetime and "BMN operators" in supersymmetric Yang–Mills theory.

== Publications ==
- Nastase, Horatiu; Vaman, Diana; Nieuwenhuizen, Peter van (1999). "Consistent nonlinear KK reduction of 11d supergravity on $Ad S_7\times S_4$ and self-duality in odd dimensions". Physics Letters B. 469 (1–4): 96–102. arXiv:hep-th/9905075. doi:10.1016/S0370-2693(99)01266-6. S2CID 14415042.
- Berenstein, David; Maldacena, Juan; Nastase, Horatiu (2002). "Strings in flat space and pp waves from N = 4 Super Yang Mills". AIP Conference Proceedings. 646. Waterloo, Ontario (Canada): AIP: 3–14. arXiv:hep-th/0202021. Bibcode:2002AIPC..646....3B. doi:10.1063/1.1524550.
