= Center for the Fundamental Laws of Nature =

Physics research center at Harvard

Harvard Center for the Fundamental Laws of Nature
- Field of research: particle physics string theory
- Director: Andrew Strominger
- Faculty: Howard Georgi; Lisa Randall; Andrew Strominger; Cumrun Vafa; Xi Yin
- Location: Cambridge, MA, United States

The Center for the Fundamental Laws of Nature is a research center at Harvard University that focuses on theoretical particle physics and cosmology.

== About ==
The Center for the Fundamental Laws of nature is the high-energy theory group in Harvard's Physics Department. As of January 2020, it had 12 faculty and affiliate faculty, 18 postdoctoral, and 19 graduate student members, in addition to multiple affiliates, visiting scholars, and staff. A number of prominent particle theorists have earned degrees or worked at Harvard, including Nobel Laureates David Politzer (PhD 1974), Sheldon Glashow (PhD 1959), David Gross, Steven Weinberg, and Julian Schwinger.

== Research ==
Current areas of research listed include:

- Quantum gravity
- String theory
- Black holes
- Applications of AdS/CFT
- Physics beyond the standard model
- Dark matter
- Effective field theories
