= David Berenstein =

American physicist

David Berenstein is a Colombian theoretical physicist and professor at University of California, Santa Barbara, USA. He received his Ph.D. from University of Texas, Austin, in 1998 under the supervision of Willy Fischler, coauthor of matrix theory. He was a visiting scholar at the Institute for Advanced Study in 2001-04 and again in the fall of 2010.

Berenstein's research mainly concerns string theory. He has made notable contributions to the theory of AdS/CFT conjecture—for example, in 2002 regarding the duality between strings on pp-wave spacetime and Berenstein–Maldacena–Nastase operators in N=4 supersymmetric Yang-Mills theory, together with Juan Maldacena and Horațiu Năstase, and more recently (since 2004) on the matrix model of BPS (Bogomol'nyi–Prasad–Sommerfield bound) states in N=4 supersymmetric Yang-Mills theory.

== Publications ==
- Berenstein, David; Maldacena, Juan; Nastase, Horatiu (2002). "Strings in flat space and pp waves from N = 4 Super Yang Mills". AIP Conference Proceedings. 646. Waterloo, Ontario (Canada): 3–14. arXiv:hep-th/0202021. Bibcode:2002AIPC..646....3B. doi:10.1063/1.1524550.
