= Kerr/CFT correspondence =

Correspondence between a Kerr black hole and a conformal field theory

The Kerr/conformal field theory (CFT) correspondence is an extension of the usual anti de Sitter/CFT correspondence or gauge-gravity duality to rotating black holes (which are described by the Kerr metric).

The duality works for black holes whose near-horizon geometry can be expressed as a product of AdS_{3} and a single compact coordinate. The AdS/CFT duality then maps this to a two-dimensional conformal field theory (the compact coordinate being analogous to the S^{5} factor in Juan Maldacena's original work), from which the correct Bekenstein entropy can then be deduced.

The original form of the duality applies to black holes with the maximum value of angular momentum, but it has now been speculatively extended to all lesser values.

== See also ==
- AdS black hole
