= Matt Strassler =

American physicist and science writer

Matthew Strassler
- Known for: Cascading gauge theory
- Awards: Fellow of the American Physical Society (2007)

Academic background
- Education: Simon's Rock College; Princeton University; Stanford University
- Thesis: The Bern-Kosower rules and their relation to quantum field theory (1993)
- Doctoral advisor: Michael Peskin

Academic work
- Discipline: Physics
- Sub-discipline: Quantum field theory; High-energy physics
- Institutions: Institute for Advanced Study; University of Washington; University of Pennsylvania; Rutgers University; Harvard University

Matthew J. Strassler is a theoretical physicist, science communicator, and educator known for the cascading gauge theory.

== Education ==
Strassler studied at Simon's Rock College and Princeton University, and later obtained his PhD from Stanford University under the supervision of Michael Peskin. During his collegiate career he also performed concerts.

== Career ==
=== Teaching and scholarly positions ===
Strassler was a member at the Institute for Advanced Study in 2002. From 2000 until 2002 he taught at the University of Pennsylvania, and then moved to the University of Washington, where he stayed until 2007. He then worked at Rutgers University until 2013. In 2013 he was a visiting scholar at Harvard, and in 2015, was an associate in the Department of Physics.

=== Scholarly publications ===
Strassler's scholarly publications has ranked h-index of 44 as of May 2024 according to INSPIRE-HEP and of 51 according to Google Scholar. His publication, "Supergravity and a confining gauge theory: duality cascades and χSB-resolution of naked singularities", co-written with Igor Klebanov for the Journal of High Energy Physics in 2000, developed the cascading gauge theory. His particle physics article "Echoes of a hidden valley at hadron colliders" (2006), co-written with Kathryn Zurek, appeared in Physics Letters B.

=== Science writing ===
Strassler's physics-oriented blog, Of Particular Significance, often includes reality-checks on mainstream media coverage of physics news. He has written for such outlets as the New Scientist. His book Waves in an Impossible Sea: How Everyday Life Emerges from the Cosmic Ocean was published in March 2024, by Basic Books.

== Accolades ==
Strassler was elected a fellow of the American Physical Society in 2007 "[f]or work extending the AdS/CFT gravity/gauge duality to QCD-like confining theories, and for insights into novel aspects of the physics of strongly coupled supersymmetric theories".
