= Andrew Strominger =

American physicist

Andrew Eben Strominger
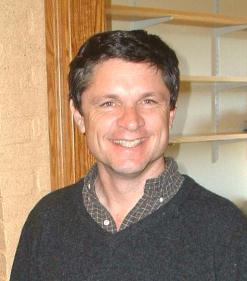
- Strominger in 2004
- Born: July 30, 1955 (age 71); Cambridge, England
- Education: Harvard College (BA); University of California, Berkeley (MA); Massachusetts Institute of Technology (PhD)
- Known for: Celestial holography; dS/CFT correspondence; CGHS model; Kerr/CFT correspondence; SYZ conjecture
- Awards: Breakthrough Prize in Fundamental Physics; Klein Medal; Dirac Medal (ICTP); Dannie Heineman Prize for Mathematical Physics
- Scientific career
- Fields: Theoretical physics
- Workplaces: Harvard University; University of California, Santa Barbara; Institute for Advanced Study
- Thesis: The large symmetry approximation in quantum field theory (1981)
- Doctoral advisor: Roman Jackiw
- Doctoral students: Ruth Britto; Sabrina Pasterski; Anastasia Volovich; Xi Yin

Andrew Eben Strominger (/ˈstrɒmɪndʒər/; born July 30, 1955) is an American theoretical physicist who is the director of Harvard's Center for the Fundamental Laws of Nature. He specializes in quantum gravity and string theory who is known for early work on celestial holography. He co-formulated the SYZ conjecture and the CGHS model.

Strominger won the Breakthrough Prize in Fundamental Physics in 2017. He was elected as a fellow to the American Academy of Arts and Sciences in 2001, to the American Physical Society in 2018, and as a Guggenheim Fellow in 2020.

== Education and early life ==
Strominger was born in Cambridge, England, to Jewish father Jack Strominger, a biochemist, and Ann, who had grown up on a farm in Minnesota as a Catholic. Before Strominger's first birthday, the family moved to St. Louis, Missouri, where his father was an assistant professor at Washington University. Six years later, his father was offered a chair at University of Wisconsin in Madison, Wisconsin; where they lived until he was 13. He spent the rest of his childhood in Lexington, Massachusetts, with three brothers, where his father was a professor at Harvard University. He said he and his brothers were interested in science and spent time in their father's labs. He attended The Cambridge School of Weston, (Note: The source lists Strominger as the class of 1972, but he stopped attending in 1970.) but after reading The Feynman Lectures on Physics, he decided he was "done with high school," describing himself as a troubled teen who got involved in substance abuse. He stopped attending in 1970 when he was a sophomore.

At age 15, Strominger left home and moved to New Hampshire to live in a commune, until he was 18. He said he commuted home to attend Harvard classes, where he learned Chinese. He then lived in Hong Kong, where he worked in factories, farms, and wrote for a Chinese language daily until he was 20. He considered becoming an investigative journalist. Strominger then returned to Harvard College, after he decided he wanted to be a theoretical physicist. He graduated with a Bachelor of Arts (AB) in Physics in 1977.

After receiving his AB, Strominger was advised to go enter a postgraduate education program at the University of California, Berkeley, where there were several Nobel laureates at the time. He said that his advisors discouraged him from continuing in the field, so after receiving his Master of Arts in 1979, he pursued a Doctor of Philosophy (PhD) at the Massachusetts Institute of Technology (MIT). He graduated in 1982.

== Research and career ==
In 1982, Strominger joined the Institute for Advanced Study as a visiting scholar. While at MIT, he began working on quantum gravity alongside his thesis work on quantum chromodynamics and Yang–Mills theory. At the IAS, he sought to approach quantum gravity from the geometric perspective of general relativity, as opposed to string theory-based approaches inspired by particle physics. In 1985 he co-discovered Calabi–Yau manifold compactifications, showing that a superstring theory could simultaneously incorporate gravity and all known particle types and suggesting that it could unify the fundamental laws of physics. This was considered to be a seminal paper of string theory.

Strominger was then offered a professorship at the University of California, Santa Barbara, where he had relocated to for the founding of the Kavli Institute for Theoretical Physics in 1979. He joined the faculty in 1986. There, he co-developed the CGHS model, and in 1991, Strominger co-discovered brane solutions of string theory, This work was the basis for his 1996 collaboration with Cumrun Vafa, which used M-theory to provide the first microscopic derivation of black hole entropy. This result gave a microscopic explanation of how black holes are able to store information and connected string theory, for the first time, to a physical problem. The same year, Strominger, Shing-Tung Yau, and Eric Zaslow introduced the SYZ conjecture as a precise formulation of mirror symmetry.

In 1997, Strominger joined Harvard as the director of the Center for the Fundamental Laws of Nature. In 2001, he introduced the dS/CFT correspondence, a version of the AdS/CFT adapted to de Sitter space, suggesting that techniques from holography could be extended beyond anti-de Sitter space to more realistic cosmological settings. Two years later in 2003, Strominger had associate with Jeffrey Epstein who gave a cheque of $100,000 to the Tata Institute of Fundamental Research, Strominger had facilitated this gift. In 2009, Strominger and collaborators developed the Kerr/CFT correspondence using ideas from AdS/CFT, which describes extremal Kerr black holes by a dual description in terms of a conformal field theory.

In 2016, Strominger, Stephen Hawking, and Malcolm Perry introduced the idea of soft hair on black holes as a potential way to resolve the black hole information paradox. Also in 2016, Strominger and his student Sabrina Pasterski discovered a novel spin memory affect, involving a connection which Pasterski found between symmetries and a spin that can be observed in gravitational waves.

In 2020, Strominger outlined a program to use the infrared triangle, an equivalence he developed between soft theorems in quantum field theory, gravitational memory effects, and the Bondi–Metzner–Sachs group, to extend the holographic principle to the flat space geometry of the universe, beyond anti-de Sitter space. He and his colleagues then developed the subfield of celestial holography. He emphasized the bottom-up nature of the framework, which provides falsifiability through the potential for observation and testable frameworks, particularly by gravitational wave detectors like LIGO or LISA. In 2021, Strominger and his colleagues derived the symmetry algebra governing celestial conformal field theories, showing that the symmetry structure expected on the celestial sphere matches a well studied algebra that appears in string theory and condensed matter systems, thereby placing strong constraints on the possible form of a flat space holographic dual.

Strominger is the collaboration director and a principal investigator of the Simons Foundation Collaboration on Celestial Holography. He is considered a pioneer of the subfield.

== Awards and honors ==
- Fellow, American Academy of Arts and Sciences, 2001
- Leonard Eisenbud Prize, American Mathematical Society, 2008
- Oskar Klein Medal, Royal Swedish Academy of Sciences, 2014
- Dirac Medal, International Centre for Theoretical Physics, 2014
- Dannie Heineman Prize for Mathematical Physics, American Physical Society, 2016
- Breakthrough Prize in Fundamental Physics, 2017
- Fellow, American Physical Society, 2018
- Fellow, John Simon Guggenheim Memorial Foundation, 2020
