= Aron Wall =

Theoretical physicist

- Born: Aron Clark Wall; June 7, 1984 (age 42)
- Education: St. John's College (Annapolis/Santa Fe) (BA) University of Maryland, College Park (PhD)
- Father: Larry Wall
- Awards: New Horizons in Physics Prize (2019)
- Scientific career
- Fields: Theoretical physics
- Workplaces: University of California, Santa Barbara; Institute for Advanced Study; Stanford Institute for Theoretical Physics; University of Cambridge
- Thesis: A proof of the generalized second law for rapidly changing fields and arbitrary horizon slices (2011)
- Doctoral advisor: Ted Jacobson
- Website: http://www.wall.org/~aron/

Aron Clark Wall is an American theoretical physicist, specializing in quantum gravity. He is Professor of Theoretical Physics at the University of Cambridge, and is one of the winners of the 2019 New Horizons in Physics Prize.

== Biography and education ==
He was born on June 7, 1984, the son of programmer Larry Wall. He received a B.A. in liberal arts in 2005 from St. John's College (Annapolis/Santa Fe) and a Ph.D. in physics in 2011 from the Maryland Center for Fundamental Physics of the University of Maryland, College Park, under advisor Ted Jacobson.

From 2011 to 2014 he was a Simons postdoctoral fellow at the University of California, Santa Barbara, from 2014 to 2017 a fellow at the Institute for Advanced Study in Princeton, from 2017 to 2019 a fellow at the Stanford Institute for Theoretical Physics. In 2019, he joined the Cambridge University Department of Applied Mathematics and Theoretical Physics as a lecturer, and in 2024 he was promoted to professor of theoretical physics.

== Research ==
In 2016, together with Ping Gao and Daniel Louis Jafferis, he proposed a mechanism for traversable wormholes without exotic matter. It is based on the interpretation of wormholes as pairs of quantum entangled particles (EPR) by Leonard Susskind and Juan Martín Maldacena, known as the ER-EPR conjecture; however, Wall and colleagues did not use the usual Einstein-Rosen Bridges, but their wormhole model provides a mathematically equivalent description to quantum teleportation.

== Most cited peer-reviewed publications ==
- Wall AC. Maximin surfaces, and the strong subadditivity of the covariant holographic entanglement entropy. Classical and Quantum Gravity. 2014 Nov 4;31(22):225007. Cited 403 times according to Google Scholar
- Engelhardt N, Wall AC. Quantum extremal surfaces: holographic entanglement entropy beyond the classical regime. Journal of High Energy Physics. 2015 Jan;2015(1):1-27. Cited 355 times
- Dong X, Harlow D, Wall AC. Reconstruction of bulk operators within the entanglement wedge in gauge-gravity duality. Physical review letters. 2016 Jul 8;117(2):021601. Cited 319 times
- Gao P, Jafferis DL, Wall AC. Traversable wormholes via a double trace deformation. Journal of High Energy Physics. 2017 Dec;2017(12):1-25. Cited 318 times
- Bousso R, Fisher Z, Leichenauer S, Wall AC. Quantum focusing conjecture. Physical Review D. 2016 Mar 16;93(6):064044. Cited 192 times
- Wall AC. Proof of the generalized second law for rapidly changing fields and arbitrary horizon slices. Physical Review D. 2012 May 29;85(10):104049. Cited 178 times

== Personal life ==
According to his website, he is active in the New Life Church of the Nazarene.
