= Cascading gauge theory =

Special type of gauge theory

In theoretical physics, a cascading gauge theory is a gauge theory whose coupling rapidly changes with the scale in such a way that Seiberg duality must be applied many times.

Igor Klebanov and Matt Strassler studied this kind of N=1 gauge theory in the context of the AdS/CFT correspondence, which is dual to the warped deformed conifold.

== See also ==
- Ultraviolet fixed point
