= Fischler–Susskind holographic bound =

Mechanism in physical cosmology

In theoretical physics, the Fischler–Susskind holographic bound is a conjectured bound on the maximum amount of entropy that a region of spacetime could have. It was proposed by Willy Fischler and Leonard Susskind in 1998 to overcome numerous issues faced by the spatial entropy bound. While the spatial bound uses the area of a spherical surface as a bound on the maximum allowed entropy contained on spatial slices enclosed by the sphere, the Fischler–Susskind bound instead uses this area as a bound on the entropy passing through the past-directed ingoing lightcones emanating from that surface. This proposal however proved to be inadequate in some physically reasonable spacetimes, which led to it being refined in the form of the covariant entropy bound the next year.

== History ==
In the early 1970s, Jacob Bekenstein and Stephen Hawking found that black holes carry an entropy equal to one fourth of the area of the event horizon in Planck units. Later, in 1981, Bekenstein argued for the Bekenstein bound as a limit on the maximum thermodynamic entropy that matter could have. Building on this, Gerard 't Hooft suggested the holographic principle in 1994, the conjecture that the statistical entropy, of any region of spacetime, is bounded by one fourth of the area of its boundary. This places a bound on the number of fundamental degrees of freedom present, rather than merely the thermodynamic entropy bound placing a limit on the amount of degrees of freedom that can be excited before the system collapses into a black hole. The next year Leonard Susskind argued that string theory may be an explicit realization of this idea, demonstrating a plausible means by which any event in a string theoretic spacetime can be mapped onto a holographic screen.

The naive version of the holographic bound initially proposed states that the entropy in some spherical spatial volume $S_V$ is bounded by its proper surface area $A$ as $S_V \leq A/4$. This spatial entropy bound was however shown to be inadequate as a general bound since it can be violated in many physically realistic scenarios. For example, it can easily be violated in closed spaces or in collapsing stars. It is even violated in weakly gravitating systems, since there always exists a spatial slicing that makes the boundary area arbitrarily small while keeping the enclosed entropy fixed.

It is also violated in cosmological contexts. For example, in flat cosmologies with constant comoving entropy density, the bound is violated by choosing a sufficiently large sphere, since the entropy in the volume grows faster than the area of the sphere. This led Willy Fischler and Leonard Susskind to propose a new holographic bound, crucially by abandoning the focus on spacelike surfaces and instead by using the area to provide a bound on the entropy passing through null hypersurfaces originating from the boundary.

== Holographic bound ==
The bound is formulated by consider a spherically symmetric spatial region $V$ with a boundary surface $\partial V = B$ with proper area $A$. Denoting the past-directed lightcone $L$ from the boundary surface $B$ towards the center of $V$, the Fischler–Susskind holographic demands that the entropy passing through the lightcone is never greater than the area of the spherical surface in Planck units $S(L)\leq A/4$.

In the case of a flat FLRW universe, this bound is equivalent to the statement that the entropy contained in the particle horizon should not exceed one fourth of the area of the particle horizon in Planck units. For a comoving entropy $\sigma$, this condition roughly translates to the condition that

$$\sigma R_H^d < (aR_H)^{d-1},$$

where $R_H$ is the comoving particle horizon radius

$$R_H(t) = \int_0^t \frac{dt}{a(t)}.$$

This bound evades the problems that the spatial entropy bound suffers from in being able to accommodate arbitrarily large spheres. This is because the past-directed lightcone of spheres bigger than the particle horizon are truncated by the initial singularity, limiting the amount of entropy that passes through them to be less than the total entropy that passes through the spatial surface bounded by the sphere.

Since the entropy-to-area ratio $S/A$ is time-dependent, spacetimes that satisfy the bound at one point in time may break it at a later point in time. For a flat FLRW universe with a fluid that has an equation of state $P=w\rho$, the bound implies that spacetimes with $-1\leq w\leq 1$ have decreasing $S/A$ with time, thus if they satisfy the bound at one point in time, they satisfy it in the future as well. The case with fluids with an equation of state $w=1$, such as occurs for kination or Kasner spacetimes, ratio is fixed over time. Fluids with $w>1$ have superluminal energy flow and so are not expected to be realized in nature; their conflict with the holographic bound is therefore expected.

== Limitations ==
While the Fischler–Susskind holographic bound works much better than the spatial entropy bound, being applicable in both flat and open universes, it fails for closed or recollapsing universes. Modifications of the bound were proposed, notably by using the apparent horizon rather than particle horizon, which avoids some of the issues associated with closed universes. However even this was shown to fail in certain situations, such as in a flat or open universes with a negative cosmological constant.

To address these concerns, the covariant entropy bound was proposed which is heavily based on the Fischler–Susskind approach. This is conjectured to apply in arbitrary cosmologies and for arbitrary surfaces. This bound also works by considering lightlike surfaces originating from a boundary surface $B$, rather than spacelike surfaces. The covariant entropy bound however considers all four possible orthogonal null hypersurfaces that can originate from a boundary surface $B$, not just the ingoing past directed lightcone. It then selects between these four null surfaces according to the criterion that the proper area of the null surfaces must be decreasing along the null hypersurface; at least two of the four surfaces always satisfy this criterion. The entropy passing through these special null hypersurfaces is conjectured to be bounded by the area.

The failure of the Fichler–Susskind bound occurs whenever the past-directed null surface fail the selection criterion of the covariant entropy bound, namely that they should have decreasing area. For example, in a collapsing universe the ingoing past directed lightcone for sufficiently large spheres had expanding areas since the universe was larger in the past. In this case one correct null hypersurface to consider is instead the future directed ingoing lightcone. This works because the time-reversal of such a collapsing spacetime shows that the future directed ingoing lightcone corresponds to the Fischler–Susskind lightcone in the time-reversed expanding universe.
