= ABJM superconformal field theory =

Superconformal quantum field theory

In theoretical physics, Aharony–Bergman–Jafferis–Maldacena (ABJM) theory is a quantum field theory introduced by Ofer Aharony, Oren Bergman, Daniel L. Jafferis, and Juan Maldacena in 2008. It provides a holographic dual to M-theory on $\mathrm{AdS}_4\times S^7$. The ABJM theory is also closely related to Chern–Simons theory, and it serves as a useful toy model for solving problems that arise in condensed matter physics. It is a theory defined on $d = 3, \mathcal{N} = 6$ superspace.

== See also ==
- 6D (2,0) superconformal field theory
