= Bousso's holographic bound =

Bound between quantum information and spacetime geometry

The Bousso bound captures a fundamental relation between quantum information and the geometry of space and time. It appears to be an imprint of a unified theory that combines quantum mechanics with Einstein's general relativity. The study of black hole thermodynamics and the information paradox led to the idea of the holographic principle: the entropy of matter and radiation in a spatial region cannot exceed the Bekenstein–Hawking entropy of the boundary of the region, which is proportional to the boundary area. However, this "spacelike" entropy bound fails in cosmology; for example, it does not hold true in our universe. The Fischler–Susskind holographic bound was proposed to address these problems. It however failed in certain situations such as closed or collapsing cosmologies and was generalized by Bousso into the covariant entropy bound.

Raphael Bousso showed that the spacelike entropy bound is violated more broadly in many dynamical settings. For example, the entropy of a collapsing star, once inside a black hole, will eventually exceed its surface area. Due to relativistic length contraction, even ordinary thermodynamic systems can be enclosed in an arbitrarily small area.

To preserve the holographic principle, Bousso proposed a different law, which does not follow from black hole physics: the covariant entropy bound or Bousso bound. Its central geometric object is a lightsheet, defined as a region traced out by non-expanding light-rays emitted orthogonally from an arbitrary surface B. For example, if B is a sphere at a moment of time in Minkowski space, then there are two lightsheets, generated by the past or future directed light-rays emitted towards the interior of the sphere at that time. If B is a sphere surrounding a large region in an expanding universe (an anti-trapped sphere), then there are again two light-sheets that can be considered. Both are directed towards the past, to the interior or the exterior. If B is a trapped surface, such as the surface of a star in its final stages of gravitational collapse, then the lightsheets are directed to the future.

The Bousso bound evades all known counterexamples to the spacelike bound. It was proven to hold when the entropy is approximately a local current, under weak assumptions. In weakly gravitating settings, the Bousso bound implies the Bekenstein bound and admits a formulation that can be proven to hold in any relativistic quantum field theory. The lightsheet construction can be inverted to construct holographic screens for arbitrary spacetimes.

A more recent proposal, the quantum focusing conjecture, implies the original Bousso bound and so can be viewed as a stronger version of it. In the limit where gravity is negligible, the quantum focusing conjecture predicts the quantum null energy condition, which relates the local energy density to a derivative of the entropy. This relation was later proven to hold in any relativistic quantum field theory, such as the Standard Model.
