= Sabrina Pasterski =

American physicist (born 1993)

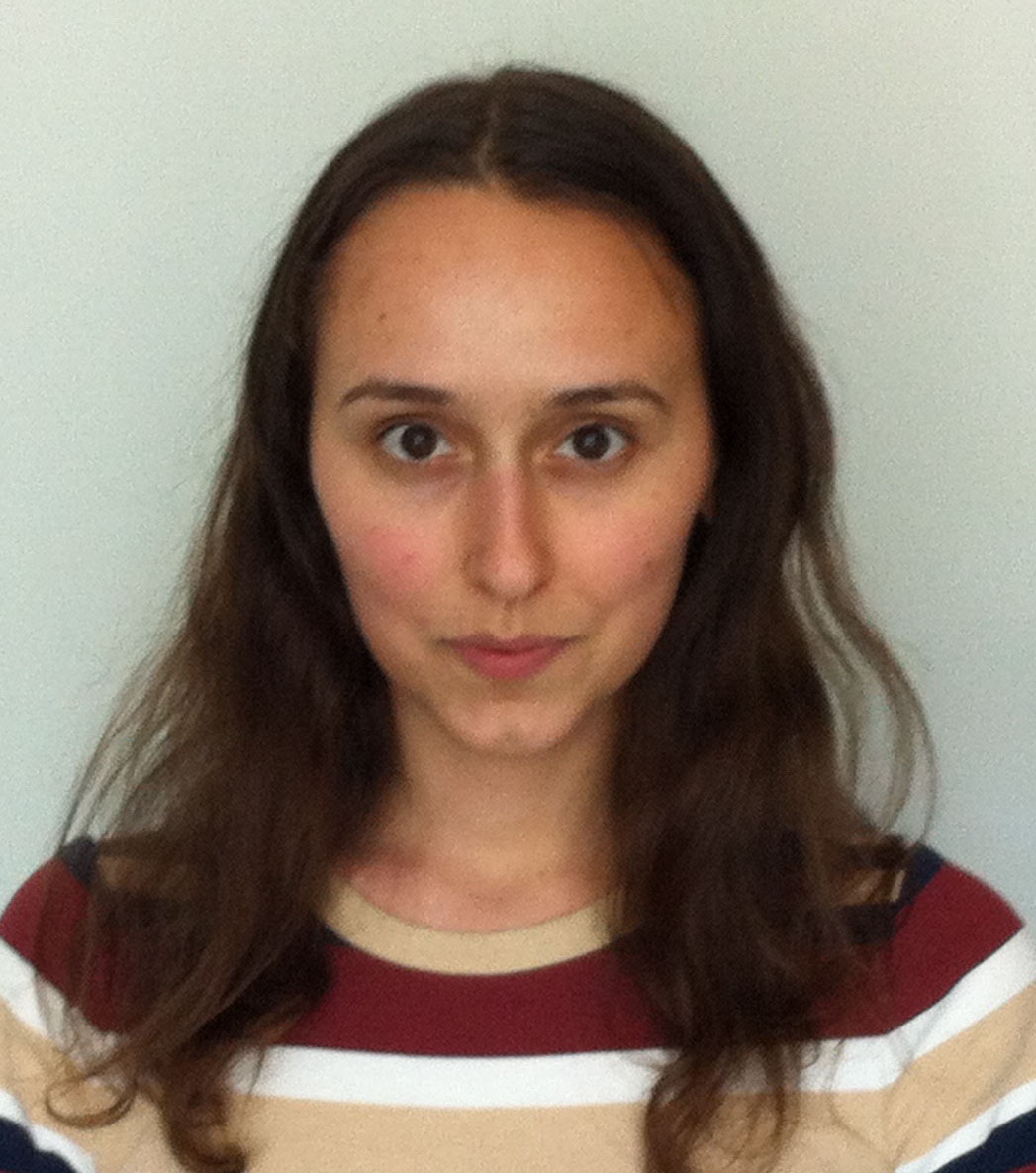
- Pasterski in 2017
- Born: Sabrina Gonzalez Pasterski; June 3, 1993 (age 33); Chicago, Illinois, U.S.
- Education: Massachusetts Institute of Technology (BS); Harvard University (PhD)
- Scientific career
- Fields: High energy physics; Celestial holography
- Workplaces: Perimeter Institute for Theoretical Physics; Princeton University
- Thesis: Implications of Superrotations (2019)
- Doctoral advisor: Andrew Strominger
- Website: physicsgirl.com

Sabrina Gonzalez Pasterski (born June 3, 1993) is an American theoretical physicist specializing in high energy physics and celestial holography at the Perimeter Institute for Theoretical Physics.

== Early life and education ==
Pasterski was born in Chicago, Illinois, to Mark Pasterski and Maria Gonzalez, both lawyers. She is of Polish and Cuban descent. She attended elementary school at the Edison Regional Gifted Center beginning in 1998.

At a young age, Pasterski had developed an interest in spaceflight and aircraft. She received a Cessna 150 for her birthday from her grandfather and her father, also a pilot, took her to Canada where she could take flying lessons. Beginning at age 12, she spent two years building a Zenith CH 601 XL from a kit, making several modifications for which she sought airworthiness certification. She was allowed to perform a flight test with a certified flight instructor prior to the National Transportation Safety Board grounding all aircraft based on the Zenith kit due to several accidents.

Pasterski attended high school at the Illinois Mathematics and Science Academy. While there, she was a semifinalist for the selection of the team representing the United States in the International Physics Olympiad, and held an internship at Blue Origin. She graduated in 2010.

She began an undergraduate degree at the Massachusetts Institute of Technology (MIT) in Fall 2010, after she was rejected by Harvard College and originally wait listed by MIT. She was selected from the wait list for the aerospace engineering program due to the aircraft she had built when she was younger. While there, she became the first freshman to be named to the NASA January Operational Internship and was among those awarded MIT's inaugural Freshman Entrepreneurship Award. In 2011, she held an internship at NASA's Kennedy Space Center. After changing majors to physics, she did research involving the Compact Muon Solenoid experiment at CERN. She received a Bachelor of Science in physics in 2013, after three years of attendance and as the first woman in decades to graduate MIT at the top of her class in the physics program and win a Joel Matthew Orloff scholarship award with a 5.0 grade point average.

She then entered a postgraduate education program at Harvard, receiving a Hertz Fellowship. While a graduate student at Harvard, she worked under the advisement of Andrew Strominger and developed an interest in quantum gravity. She, Strominger, and another colleague, Alexander Zhiboedov, discovered a novel gravitational memory effect, a connection which Pasterski found between symmetries and a spin memory effect that can be observed in gravitational waves.

She obtained a Ph.D. from Harvard in physics in 2019.

== Career and research ==
After obtaining her PhD, Pasterski completed post-doctoral work as a fellow at Princeton University from 2019 until 2022. At Princeton, she began work on celestial holography, a hypothetical holography of the universe. She joined the Perimeter Institute for Theoretical Physics in 2021, where she is the founder and principal investigator of the Celestial Holography Initiative.

== Selected publications ==
- Pasterski, Sabrina; Shao, Shu-Heng; Strominger, Andrew (September 28, 2017). "Flat space amplitudes and conformal symmetry of the celestial sphere". Physical Review D. 96 (6). arXiv:1701.00049. doi:10.1103/PhysRevD.96.065026. ISSN 2470-0010.
- Pasterski, Sabrina; Shao, Shu-Heng (September 25, 2017). "Conformal basis for flat space amplitudes". Physical Review D. 96 (6). arXiv:1705.01027. doi:10.1103/PhysRevD.96.065022. ISSN 2470-0010.
- Pasterski, Sabrina; Strominger, Andrew; Zhiboedov, Alexander (2016). "New gravitational memories". Journal of High Energy Physics. 2016 (12). arXiv:1502.06120. doi:10.1007/JHEP12(2016)053. ISSN 1029-8479.
- Pasterski, Sabrina (2021). "Lectures on celestial amplitudes". The European Physical Journal C. 81 (12). arXiv:2108.04801. doi:10.1140/epjc/s10052-021-09846-7. ISSN 1434-6044.
- Pasterski, Sabrina; Shao, Shu-Heng; Strominger, Andrew (October 27, 2017). "Gluon amplitudes as 2 d conformal correlators". Physical Review D. 96 (8). arXiv:1706.03917. doi:10.1103/PhysRevD.96.085006. ISSN 2470-0010.
- Pasterski, Sabrina (2017). "Asymptotic symmetries and electromagnetic memory". Journal of High Energy Physics. 2017 (9). arXiv:1505.00716. doi:10.1007/JHEP09(2017)154. ISSN 1029-8479.

== Awards and honors ==
- 2013: European Physical Society High Energy and Particle Physics Prize, MIT-CMS
- 2015: Forbes 30 under 30, Science
- 2017: Forbes 30 under 30, All Star
- 2018: InStyle - Badass Woman, TIME Inc.
