= Lev Levitin =

Russian-American engineer

Lev B. Levitin is a Russian-American engineer, currently a distinguished professor at Boston University and a Life Fellow of the IEEE. His current research interests include information theory, physical aspects of computation, complex systems and quantum measurement. He is known for the Margolus–Levitin theorem.
