= Hans-Joachim Bremermann =

German-American mathematician and biophysicist (1926–1996)

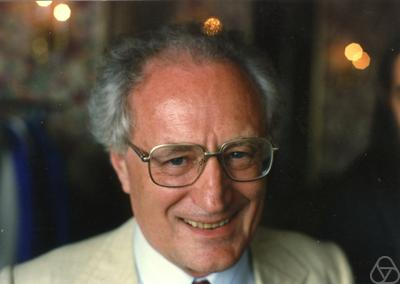
- Bremermann in 1989
- Born: 14 September 1926; Bremen, Weimar Germany
- Died: 21 February 1996 (aged 69); Berkeley, California, U.S.
- Education: University of Münster
- Known for: Bremermann's limit Edge-of-the-wedge theorem
- Scientific career
- Fields: Mathematics; Biophysics
- Workplaces: University of California, Berkeley; University of Washington; Harvard University; Stanford University
- Doctoral advisors: Heinrich Behnke
- Doctoral students: Lotfi Zadeh

Hans-Joachim Bremermann (1926–1996) was a German-American mathematician and biophysicist. He worked on computer science and evolution, introducing ideas of how mating generates new gene combinations. Bremermann's limit, named after him, is the maximum computational speed of a self-contained system in the material universe.

== Early life ==
Bremermann was born in 1926, in Bremen, Germany, to Bernard Bremermann and Berta Wicke.

Bremermann undertook doctoral studies at the University of Münster, completing his Staatsexamen in mathematics and physics in 1951. In the same year, his doctoral dissertation Die Charakterisierung von Regularitätsgebieten durch pseudokonvexe Funktionen was published, in which he solved a special case of the Levi problem. He was to become a specialist in complex analysis.

== Career ==
Bremermann came to the United States in 1952 and held a research associate position at Stanford University. In 1953, he was appointed a research fellow at Harvard University. He returned to Münster for 1954–55.

After returning to the United States, he was a mathematics researcher at the Institute for Advanced Study in Princeton (1955–57), and then appointed assistant professor at the University of Washington, Seattle (1957–58). He then spent another year researching at Princeton (1958–59), this time in physics.

In 1959, he became an associate professor of mathematics at University of California, Berkeley, where he remained for the rest of his career, being promoted to full professor in 1966. He held chairs at Berkeley in mathematics and biophysics. By the 1960s, his work had turned towards the theory of computation and evolutionary biology, in which he studied complexity theory, genetic search algorithms, and pattern recognition.

In 1978, he gave the "What Physicists Do" series of lectures at Sonoma State University, discussing physical limitations to mathematical understanding of physical and biological systems. He continued work in mathematical biology through the 1980s, developing mathematical models of parasites and disease, neural networks, and AIDS epidemiology and pathology. He retired from the University of California in 1991.

== Personal life ==
On 16 May 1954, Bremermann married Maria Isabel Lopez Perez-Ojeda, a scholar of romance language and literature. He died in 1996, aged 69 or 70.

== Legacy ==
R.W. Anderson writes:

[Bremermann] continued to develop mathematical modelling as a tool to understanding complex (especially biological) systems for the rest of his life. His intellectual journey was marked by brilliant insight and foresight. [...] Hans Bremermann is not only remembered for his genius but also for his warmth, generosity, courage, integrity, humility, and love.

In 1995, a festschrift was published with a brief biography and 13 scientific papers of his former students and colleagues in a special issue of BioSystems.

== See also ==
- Bremermann's limit
- Transcomputational problem
