= Laura Landweber =

American evolutionary biologist

- Education: Princeton University A.B., Harvard University Ph.D.
- Known for: RNA mediated epigenetic control, unusual genome organisation, genome evolution, computational molecular biology, DNA computers
- Spouse: Steven Gubser
- Children: 3
- Awards: 2001 - Tulip Award for DNA Computing, 2005, Fellow of American Association for the Advancement of Science, 2008. Regional Award Winner Blavatnik Awards for Young Scientists from The New York Academy of Sciences, 2012 - Guggenheim Fellow
- Scientific career
- Fields: evolution of genomes, DNA computers, structure and function of unusual genomes in Oxytrichia and other organisms
- Workplaces: Columbia University, Princeton University
- Thesis: "RNA editing and the evolution of mitochondrial DNA in kinetoplastid protozoa." (1993)

Laura Faye Landweber is an American evolutionary biologist. As of 2016, she is a professor of biochemistry and molecular biophysics and of biological sciences at Columbia University. Previously, she was a professor of ecology and evolutionary biology at Princeton University. She specializes in RNA-mediated epigenetic inheritance and molecular evolution.

== Education ==
Landweber graduated summa cum laude with an A.B. in molecular biology from Princeton University in 1989 after completing a 50-page-long senior thesis titled "A Method for Evolutionary Sequence Analysis of Genes and Pseudogenes Using the Polymerase Chain Reaction: Applications to the Mouse Tcp-1 Gene" in which she described linear PCR.

She received her M.A. and Ph.D. from Harvard University in 1991 and 1993, respectively. Her doctoral dissertation is titled "RNA editing and the evolution of mitochondrial DNA in kinetoplastid protozoa."

== Research career ==
In 1994, Landweber became a faculty member of Princeton University at the age of 26.

In a 2000 paper published in the Proceedings of the National Academy of Sciences of the United States of America on biocomputers, Landweber solved chess's knights problem, where one determines how many non-attacking knights can be placed on a chessboard, using a test tube of RNA, a breakthrough in DNA computing.

Laura Landweber has also studied the evolution of the genetic code and the scrambled genomes of ciliates such as Oxytricha. Her laboratory has supported the notion that the code was no accident but arose from affinities between the nucleic acid codons and their cognate amino acids. Her studies of the massive rearrangements of the genome in the micronucleus of Oxytricha showed an unsuspected role for non-coding RNA in directing the process epigenetically.

== Publications (books) ==
- DNA Based Computers II (1998), Landweber, L. and Baum, E., eds, American Mathematicsl Society
- Genetics and the Extinction of Species: DNA and the Conservation of Biodiversity (1999), Landweber, L. F. and Dobson, A. P., eds, Princeton University Press
- Evolution as Computation (2003), Landweber, L. F. and Winfree, E., eds, Springer Verlag

== Awards and honors ==
- 1999 – Sigma Xi Young Investigator Award
- 2001 - Tulip Award for DNA Computing
- 2005 - American Association for the Advancement of Science Fellow
- 2008 - Regional Award Winner, Blavatnik Awards for Young Scientists, The New York Academy of Sciences
- 2012 - Guggenheim Fellow
- 2014 - Division R Lecturer, American Society for Microbiology
- 2017 - President, Society for Molecular Biology and Evolution

== Personal life ==
Laura Landweber was married to physicist Steven Gubser and has three daughters.
