= DS/CFT correspondence =

Correspondence between de Sitter space and conformal field theory

In string theory, the de Sitter/conformal field theory correspondence, shortened to dS/CFT correspondence, is a de Sitter space analogue of the anti-de Sitter space version known as adS/CFT correspondence. The dS/CFT correspondence was proposed originally by Andrew Strominger in 2001. In this correspondence, the conjectured CFT boundary is in the future, and time is the emergent dimension.
