= Steven Gubser =

American physicist (1972–2019)

- Born: Steven Scott Gubser; May 4, 1972; Tulsa, Oklahoma, U.S.
- Died: August 3, 2019 (aged 47); Chamonix, France
- Education: Princeton University (B.Sc, Ph.D.); Cambridge University
- Known for: AdS/CFT correspondence AdS/QCD correspondence AdS/CMT correspondence
- Spouse: Laura Landweber
- Children: 3
- Awards: LeRoy Apker Award (1994); Blavatnik Award (2008); Guggenheim Fellowship (2009); Gribov Medal (2011)
- Scientific career
- Workplaces: Harvard Society of Fellows; California Institute of Technology; Princeton University
- Doctoral advisor: Igor Klebanov

Steven Scott Gubser (May 4, 1972 – August 3, 2019) was a professor of physics at Princeton University. His research focused on theoretical particle physics, especially string theory, and the AdS/CFT correspondence. He was a widely cited scholar in these and other related areas.

Gubser did foundational work in the AdS/CFT correspondence as a graduate student. In particular, his 1998 paper Gauge Theory Correlators from Non-Critical String Theory with his advisor Igor Klebanov and another Princeton physics professor Alexander Markovich Polyakov, made a precise statement of the AdS/CFT duality. It is one of the all-time top cited papers in theoretical high-energy physics, and is commonly known, along with Edward Witten's 1998 work Anti De Sitter Space And Holography, as the GKPW dictionary. After receiving a Ph.D. in 1998 from Princeton, Gubser became a junior fellow at Harvard University before taking a position as an assistant professor at Princeton. In 2001, he moved to the California Institute of Technology but returned to Princeton in 2002. Gubser's later works concern various aspects of the AdS/CFT correspondence, including its applications in quantum chromodynamics and condensed matter physics. In 2016 he and collaborators proposed a p-adic version of AdS/CFT correspondence whose bulk geometry is a tree graph.

As a high school student in 1989, Gubser was the first American to be grand winner (ranked first among all gold medalists) of the International Physics Olympiad. He graduated from Cherry Creek High School in Greenwood Village, Colorado.

He graduated as the valedictorian of the class of 1994 from Princeton University. For his senior thesis he was awarded the LeRoy Apker Award of the American Physical Society, the highest distinction for undergraduate research.

== Awards ==
- 1994 LeRoy Apker Award for outstanding undergraduate achievement from the American Physical Society
- 2008 Blavatnik Award of the New York Academy of Sciences
- 2009 Guggenheim Fellowship
- 2011 Gribov Medal of the European Physical Society
- 2017 Simons Investigator

== Personal life & death ==
Gubser was married to Laura Landweber, and they had three daughters.

Gubser died in a rock climbing accident in Chamonix, France, on August 3, 2019. Gubser was climbing Aiguille du Peigne "Comb Needle" on the Mont Blanc massif, when a rope broke and he fell to his death.
