= String background =

In theoretical physics, a string background refers to the set of classical values of quantum fields in spacetime that correspond to classical solutions of string theory. Such a background is associated with geometry that solves Einstein's field equations (with higher order corrections) or their generalizations and with the values of other fields. These fields may encode the information about the shape of the hidden dimensions; the size of various electromagnetic fields and their generalizations; the values of fluxes; and the presence of additional objects such as D-branes and orientifold planes. The full physics of string theory can always be thought of as a system of infinitely many quantum fields expanded around a given string background.

== See also ==
- Background independence
