= Raphael Bousso =

American physicist

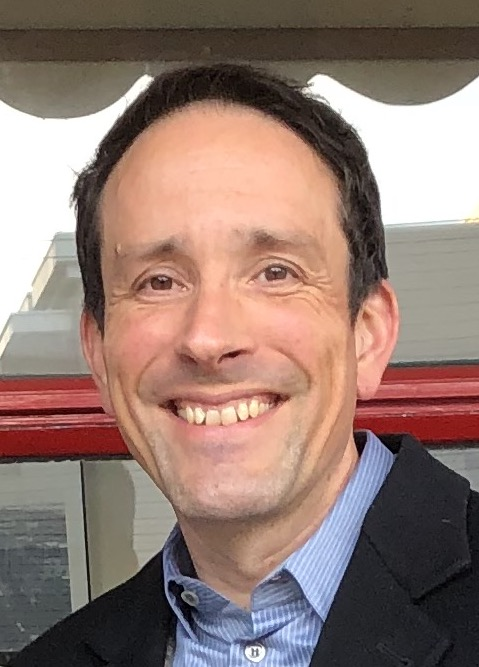
- Born: 1971 (age 54–55); Haifa, Israel
- Education: University of Cambridge (PhD)
- Known for: Bousso bound String theory landscape
- Awards: Fellow of the American Physical Society (2012); Member of the American Academy of Arts and Sciences (2026)
- Scientific career
- Fields: Theoretical physics, cosmology, quantum gravity
- Workplaces: University of California, Berkeley; Stanford University; Kavli Institute for Theoretical Physics; Harvard University
- Thesis: Pair creation of black holes in cosmology (1997)
- Doctoral advisor: Stephen Hawking

Raphael Bousso (/ˈbuːsoʊ/) (born 1971) is a theoretical physicist and cosmologist. He is a professor at UC Berkeley, where he holds the Chancellor's Chair in Physics. He is known for the Bousso bound on the information content of the universe. With Joseph Polchinski, Bousso proposed the string theory landscape as a solution to the cosmological constant problem.

== Life and career ==
Bousso was born in Haifa, Israel, the son of late scientist Dino Bousso. He grew up near Augsburg, Germany, where he studied physics from 1990 until 1993. Bousso earned his Ph.D. at Cambridge University in 1997; his doctoral advisor was Stephen Hawking. Bousso did postdoctoral research at Stanford University until 2000, and at the Kavli Institute for Theoretical Physics in Santa Barbara until 2002. In 2002/03, Bousso was a fellow at the Harvard University physics department and the Radcliffe Institute for Advanced Study. Since 2002, he has been a professor in the physics department at the University of California, Berkeley. In 2012, Bousso was elected Fellow of the American Physical Society "for fundamental discoveries in the field of quantum cosmology, including the covariant entropy bound and the string landscape." In 2026, he was elected to the American Academy of Arts and Sciences.

== Research ==
Bousso's research is focused on quantum gravity and cosmology, particularly through the study of quantum information. His 1999 covariant entropy bound (Bousso bound) established a general relation between quantum information and the geometry of spacetime (i.e., gravity). The Bousso bound has since been refined and strengthened, leading to provable new results in quantum field theory, such as the quantum null energy condition. Bousso has also worked on the black hole information paradox (firewall problem). Since 2018, he has led a consortium of theoretical and experimental physicists exploring and developing the relations between quantum gravity, quantum information, and quantum computing.

In 2000, Bousso and Joseph Polchinski argued that string theory has many long-lived vacua, including solutions compatible with the observed positive value of the cosmological constant (vacuum energy). This came to be called the "landscape of string theory." Bousso has developed an approach to the cosmological measure problem, with the ultimate goal of testing the string theory landscape.
