= Xi Yin =

Chinese-American theoretical physicist

- 尹希
- Born: December 1983 (age 42); Zhuzhou, Hunan, China
- Education: Harvard University; University of Science and Technology of China
- Known for: Higher-spin theory
- Awards: New Horizons in Physics Prize
- Scientific career
- Fields: Theoretical Physics
- Workplaces: Harvard University

Xi Yin (Chinese: 尹希; pinyin: Yǐn Xī; born December 1983) is a Chinese-American theoretical physicist.

== Biography ==
Yin was accepted to University of Science and Technology of China in 1996, at the age of 12, and completed the (then) 5-year bachelor program in 2001. He gained a PhD at Harvard University in 2006, under the supervision of Andrew Strominger. He was a Junior Fellow at the Harvard Society of Fellows, and a Visiting Member at the Institute for Advanced Study. He joined the Harvard faculty in 2008, and is now a Professor of Physics.

Yin is a recipient of NSF CAREER Award, Sloan Research Fellowship, and New Horizons in Physics Prize. He is a Simons Investigator, and a principal investigator of the Simons Bootstrap Collaboration.

Yin ran the Boston marathon three times, and completed the Leadville Trail 100 Run in 2011.
