= Igor Klebanov =

American theoretical physicist (born 1962)

Igor R. Klebanov
- Born: 1962 (age 63–64)
- Education: Massachusetts Institute of Technology (BS); Princeton University (PhD)
- Known for: AdS/CFT correspondence, Klebanov-Strassler solution, Higher-spin theory
- Scientific career
- Fields: Theoretical physics String theory
- Doctoral advisor: Curtis Callan
- Doctoral students: Steven Gubser
- Website: www.princeton.edu/physics/research/high-energy-theory/

Igor R. Klebanov (born 1962) is an American theoretical physicist. Since 1989, he has been a faculty member at Princeton University, where he is currently a Eugene Higgins Professor of Physics and the director of the Princeton Center for Theoretical Science. In 2016, he was elected to the National Academy of Sciences. Since 2022, he is the director of the Simons Collaboration on Confinement and QCD Strings.

Klebanov received his undergraduate education at the Massachusetts Institute of Technology, class of 1982, and his Ph.D. degree at Princeton University in 1986 as a student of Curtis Callan. In his thesis he made advances in the Skyrme model of hadrons, which included the first paper on a Skyrmion crystal. Klebanov worked as a post-doc in the SLAC Theory Group. His main contributions to string theory are in matrix model approaches, in brane dynamics, and in the gauge theory-gravity duality. His work in 1996-97 on relations between branes in supergravity and their gauge theory description anticipated the gauge theory-gravity correspondence.

Klebanov's 1998 paper, Gauge Theory Correlators from Non-Critical String Theory, with his graduate student Steven Gubser, and another Princeton Alexander M. Polyakov, made a precise statement of the AdS/CFT duality. It is among the top cited papers in theoretical high-energy physics. A series of papers by Klebanov and collaborators on D-branes on the conifold has led to discovery of cascading gauge theory. Its dual warped throat provides a geometric description of color confinement and chiral symmetry breaking; it has been used in model building for cosmology and particle physics. The relation between 3-dimensional critical O(N) model and bosonic higher-spin gauge theory in 4-dimensional AdS space has been called the Klebanov-Polyakov correspondence.

Klebanov's more recent work includes the Entanglement Entropy in confining gauge theories, the F-theorem for Renormalization Group flows, large N tensor models, field theory descriptions of critical phenomena, and quantum many-body scars as group invariant states.

== Honors ==
- 2010 Guggenheim Fellowship
- 2010 Princeton University Graduate Mentoring Award
- 2012 Elected to the American Academy of Arts and Sciences.
- 2014 Tomassoni awards
- 2016 Elected to the U.S. National Academy of Sciences.
- 2017 Pomeranchuk Prize
- 2022 Oskar Klein Medal
- 2023 Dirac Medal (ICTP)

== Works ==
- hep-th/9108019 "String Theory in Two Dimensions", High Energy Physics - Theory (hep-th) Igor R. Klebanov, 26 Aug 1991
- Klebanov, Igor R. (1997). "World-volume approach to absorption by non-dilatonic branes". Nuclear Physics B. 496 (1–2). Elsevier BV: 231–242. arXiv:hep-th/9702076. Bibcode:1997NuPhB.496..231K. doi:10.1016/s0550-3213(97)00235-6. ISSN 0550-3213. S2CID 17484997.
- Gubser, S.S.; Klebanov, I.R.; Polyakov, A.M. (1998). "Gauge theory correlators from non-critical string theory". Physics Letters B. 428 (1–2). Elsevier BV: 105–114. arXiv:hep-th/9802109. Bibcode:1998PhLB..428..105G. doi:10.1016/s0370-2693(98)00377-3. ISSN 0370-2693. S2CID 15693064.
- Klebanov, Igor R; Strassler, Matthew J (August 31, 2000). "Supergravity and a confining gauge theory: duality cascades and χSB-resolution of naked singularities". Journal of High Energy Physics. 2000 (8). Springer Science and Business Media LLC: 052. arXiv:hep-th/0007191. Bibcode:2000JHEP...08..052K. doi:10.1088/1126-6708/2000/08/052. ISSN 1029-8479. S2CID 2484915.
- Klebanov, I.R; Polyakov, A.M (2002). "AdS dual of the critical O(N) vector model". Physics Letters B. 550 (3–4). Elsevier BV: 213–219. arXiv:hep-th/0210114. Bibcode:2002PhLB..550..213K. doi:10.1016/s0370-2693(02)02980-5. ISSN 0370-2693. S2CID 14628213.
- "Some stringy aspects of the AdS/CFT duality", Strings 2002, Igor Klebanov
- Solving Quantum Field Theories via Curved Spacetimes, Physics Today, Igor Klebanov and Juan Maldacena
- Klebanov, Igor R.; Kutasov, David; Murugan, Arvind (2008). "Entanglement as a probe of confinement". Nuclear Physics B. 796 (1–2). Elsevier BV: 274–293. arXiv:0709.2140. Bibcode:2008NuPhB.796..274K. doi:10.1016/j.nuclphysb.2007.12.017. ISSN 0550-3213. S2CID 15648248.
- Klebanov, Igor R.; Pufu, Silviu S.; Safdi, Benjamin R. (2011). "F-theorem without supersymmetry". Journal of High Energy Physics. 2011 (10). Springer Science and Business Media LLC: 038. arXiv:1105.4598. doi:10.1007/JHEP10(2011)038.
- Klebanov, Igor R.; Tarnopolsky, Grigory (February 13, 2017). "Uncolored random tensors, melon diagrams, and the Sachdev-Ye-Kitaev models". Physical Review D. 95 (4) 046004. American Physical Society (APS). arXiv:1611.08915. Bibcode:2017PhRvD..95d6004K. doi:10.1103/physrevd.95.046004. ISSN 2470-0010. S2CID 119391475.
