= Quantum speed limit =

Limitation on the minimum time for a quantum system to evolve between two states

In quantum mechanics, a quantum speed limit (QSL) is a limitation on the minimum time for a quantum system to evolve between two distinguishable (orthogonal) states. QSL theorems are closely related to time-energy uncertainty relations. In 1945, Leonid Mandelstam and Igor Tamm derived a time-energy uncertainty relation that bounds the speed of evolution in terms of the energy dispersion. Over half a century later, Norman Margolus and Lev Levitin showed that the speed of evolution cannot exceed the mean energy, a result known as the Margolus–Levitin theorem. Realistic physical systems in contact with an environment are known as open quantum systems and their evolution is also subject to QSL. Quite remarkably it was shown that environmental effects, such as non-Markovian dynamics can speed up quantum processes, which was verified in a cavity QED experiment.

QSL have been used to explore the limits of computation and complexity. In 2017, QSLs were studied in a quantum oscillator at high temperature. In 2018, it was shown that QSL are not restricted to the quantum domain and that similar bounds hold in classical systems. In 2021, both the Mandelstam-Tamm and the Margolus–Levitin QSL bounds were concurrently tested in a single experiment which indicated there are "two different regimes: one where the Mandelstam-Tamm limit constrains the evolution at all times, and a second where a crossover to the Margolus-Levitin limit occurs at longer times."

In quantum sensing, QSLs impose fundamental constraints on the maximum achievable time resolution of quantum sensors. These limits stem from the requirement that quantum states must evolve to orthogonal states to extract precise information. For example, in applications like Ramsey interferometry, the QSL determines the minimum time required for phase accumulation during control sequences, directly impacting the sensor's temporal resolution and sensitivity.

== Preliminary definitions ==
The speed limit theorems can be stated for pure states, and for mixed states; they take a simpler form for pure states. An arbitrary pure state can be written as a linear combination of energy eigenstates:

$$|\psi\rangle = \sum_n c_n |E_n\rangle.$$

The task is to provide a lower bound for the time interval $t_\perp$ required for the initial state $|\psi\rangle$ to evolve into a state orthogonal to $|\psi\rangle$. The time evolution of a pure state is given by the Schrödinger equation:

$$|\psi_t\rangle = \sum_n c_n e^{itE_n/\hbar}|E_n\rangle.$$

Orthogonality is obtained when

$$\langle\psi_0|\psi_t\rangle=0$$

and the minimum time interval $t=t_\perp$ required to achieve this condition is called the orthogonalization interval or orthogonalization time.

== Mandelstam–Tamm limit ==
For pure states, the Mandelstam–Tamm theorem states that the minimum time $t_{\perp}$ required for a state to evolve into an orthogonal state is bounded below:

$$t_{\perp} \ge \frac{\pi\hbar}{2\,\delta E}= \frac{h}{4\,\delta E}$$,

where

$$(\delta E)^2 = \left\langle \psi|H^2|\psi\right\rangle - (\left\langle \psi|H|\psi\right\rangle)^2
=\frac{1}{2}\sum_{n,m} |c_n|^2 |c_m|^2 (E_n-E_m)^2$$,

is the variance of the system's energy and $H$ is the Hamiltonian operator. The quantum evolution is independent of the particular Hamiltonian used to transport the quantum system along a given curve in the projective Hilbert space; the distance along this curve is measured by the Fubini–Study metric. This is sometimes called the quantum angle, as it can be understood as the arccos of the inner product of the initial and final states.

=== For mixed states ===
The Mandelstam–Tamm limit can also be stated for mixed states and for time-varying Hamiltonians. In this case, the Bures metric must be employed in place of the Fubini–Study metric. A mixed state can be understood as a sum over pure states, weighted by classical probabilities; likewise, the Bures metric is a weighted sum of the Fubini–Study metric. For a time-varying Hamiltonian $H_t$ and time-varying density matrix $\rho_t,$ the variance of the energy is given by

$$\sigma^2_H(t)=|\text{tr}(\rho_t H^2_{t})|-|\text{tr}(\rho_t H_{t})|^2$$

The Mandelstam–Tamm limit then takes the form

$$\int_0^{\tau} \sigma_H(t) dt \geq \hbar D_B(\rho_0, \rho_{\tau})$$,

where $D_B$ is the Bures distance between the starting and ending states. The Bures distance is geodesic, giving the shortest possible distance of any continuous curve connecting two points, with $\sigma_H(t)$ understood as an infinitessimal path length along a curve parametrized by $t.$ Equivalently, the time $\tau$ taken to evolve from $\rho$ to $\rho'$ is bounded as

$$\tau \geq \frac{\hbar}{\overline\sigma_H}D_B(\rho, \rho')$$

where

$$\overline \sigma_H = \frac{1}{\tau}\int_0^\tau \sigma_H(t)dt$$

is the time-averaged uncertainty in energy. For a pure state evolving under a time-varying Hamiltonian, the time $\tau$ taken to evolve from one pure state to another pure state orthogonal to it is bounded as

$$\tau \geq \frac{\hbar}{\overline\sigma_H} \frac{\pi}{2}$$

This follows, as for a pure state, one has the density matrix $\rho_t=|\psi_t\rangle\langle\psi_t|.$ The quantum angle (Fubini–Study distance) is then $D_B(\rho_0,\rho_t)=\arccos| \langle\psi_0|\psi_t\rangle|$ and so one concludes $D_B=\arccos 0=\pi/2$ when the initial and final states are orthogonal.

== Margolus–Levitin limit ==
For the case of a pure state, Margolus and Levitin obtain a different limit, that

$$\tau_\perp \geq \frac{h}{4\langle E\rangle},$$

where $\langle E\rangle$ is the average energy,
$$\langle E \rangle = E_\text{avg} = \langle \psi |H | \psi \rangle =\sum_n |c_n|^2 E_n.$$
This form applies when the Hamiltonian is not time-dependent, and the ground-state energy is defined to be zero.

=== For time-varying states ===
The Margolus–Levitin theorem can also be generalized to the case where the Hamiltonian varies with time, and the system is described by a mixed state. In this form, it is given by

$$\int_0^{\tau}|\text{tr}(\rho_t H_{t})| dt \geq \hbar D_B(\rho_0, \rho_{\tau})$$

with the ground-state defined so that it has energy zero at all times.

This provides a result for time varying states. Although it also provides a bound for mixed states, the bound (for mixed states) can be so loose as to be uninformative. The Margolus–Levitin theorem has not yet been experimentally established in time-dependent quantum systems, whose Hamiltonians $H_t$ are driven by arbitrary time-dependent parameters, except for the adiabatic case.

=== Dual Margolus–Levitin limit ===
In addition to the original Margolus–Levitin limit, a dual bound exists for quantum systems with a bounded energy spectrum. This dual bound, also known as the Ness–Alberti–Sagi limit or the Ness limit, depends on the difference between the state's mean energy and the energy of the highest occupied eigenstate. In bounded systems, the minimum time $\tau_{\perp}$ required for a state to evolve to an orthogonal state is bounded by

$\tau_{\perp} \geq \frac{h}{4(E_{\max}-\langle E\rangle)},$

where $E_{\max}$ is the energy of the highest occupied eigenstate and $\langle E\rangle$ is the mean energy of the state. This bound complements the original Margolus–Levitin limit and the Mandelstam–Tamm limit, forming a trio of constraints on quantum evolution speed.

== Levitin–Toffoli limit ==
A 2009 result by Lev B. Levitin and Tommaso Toffoli states that the precise bound for the Mandelstam–Tamm theorem is attained only for a qubit state. This is a two-level state in an equal superposition

$$\left|\psi_q\right\rangle = \frac{1}{\sqrt{2}}\left(\left|E_0\right\rangle + e^{i \varphi}\left|E_1\right\rangle \right)$$

for energy eigenstates $E_0=0$ and $E_1=\pm \pi\hbar /\Delta t$. The states $\left|E_0\right\rangle$ and $\left|E_1\right\rangle$ are unique up to degeneracy of the energy level $E_1$ and an arbitrary phase factor $\varphi.$ This result is sharp, in that this state also satisfies the Margolus–Levitin bound, in that $E_\text{avg}=\delta E$ and so $t_{\perp}=\hbar\pi/2E_\text{avg}=\hbar\pi/2\delta E.$ This result establishes that the combined limits are strict:

$$t_\perp\ge\max\left(\frac{\pi\hbar}{2\,\delta E}\;,\; \frac{\pi\hbar}{2\,E_\text{avg}}\right)$$

Levitin and Toffoli also show that, for a given orthogonalization time, one can always find a state with $E_\text{max} < h/t_\perp$ and $E_\text{max}/4 \le E_\text{avg} \le E_\text{max}/2$, where $E_\text{max}$ is the maximum energy eigenvalue appearing in $\left|\psi\right\rangle$ (with the ground-state energy set to zero). For any pure state, the orthogonalization time is bounded from below in terms of the maximum energy:

$$t_{\perp} \ge \frac{\pi \hbar}{E_\text{max}},$$

with equality only for an equal-weight superposition of two energy eigenstates.

The strict lower bound $E_\text{max} t_{\perp} = \pi \hbar$ is again attained for the qubit state $\left|\psi_q\right\rangle$ with $E_\text{max} = E_1$.

== Bremermann's limit ==
The quantum speed limit bounds establish an upper bound at which computation can be performed. Computational machinery is constructed out of physical matter that follows quantum mechanics, and each operation, if it is to be unambiguous, must be a transition of the system from one state to an orthogonal state. Suppose the computing machinery is a physical system evolving under Hamiltonian that does not change with time. Then, according to the Margolus–Levitin theorem, the number of operations per unit time per unit energy is bounded above by
$$\frac{2}{\hbar \pi} = 6 \times 10^{33}\ \text{s}^{-1} \cdot \text{J}^{-1}.$$
This establishes a strict upper limit on the number of calculations that can be performed by physical matter. The processing rate of all forms of computation cannot be higher than about 6×10^{33} operations per second per joule of energy. This is including "classical" computers, since even classical computers are still made of matter that follows quantum mechanics.

This bound is not merely a fanciful limit: it has practical ramifications for quantum-resistant cryptography. Imagining a computer operating at this limit, a brute-force search to break a 128-bit encryption key requires only modest resources. Brute-forcing a 256-bit key requires planetary-scale computers, while a brute-force search of 512-bit keys is effectively unattainable within the lifetime of the universe, even if galactic-sized computers were applied to the problem.

The Bekenstein bound limits the amount of information that can be stored within a volume of space. The maximal rate of change of information within that volume of space is given by the quantum speed limit. This product of limits is sometimes called the Bremermann–Bekenstein limit; it is saturated by Hawking radiation. That is, Hawking radiation is emitted at the maximal allowed rate set by these bounds.
