= Juan Maldacena =

Argentine physicist (born 1968)

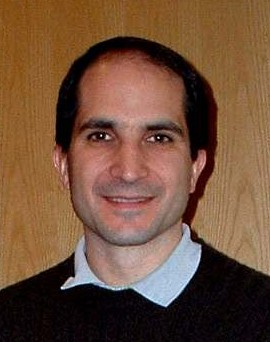
- Born: 10 September 1968 (age 58); Buenos Aires, Argentina
- Education: Balseiro Institute (BS); Princeton University (PhD)
- Known for: AdS/CFT correspondence ER = EPR; ABJM superconformal field theory
- Awards: Alfred P. Sloan Foundation Fellowship; Sackler Prize; MacArthur Fellowship; Xanthopoulos Award; Pius XI Medal; Dirac Medal; Pomeranchuk Prize; Breakthrough Prize in Fundamental Physics; Lorentz Medal; Albert Einstein Medal; St. Albert Award; Galileo Galilei Medal
- Scientific career
- Fields: Theoretical physics
- Workplaces: Institute for Advanced Study
- Thesis: Black Holes in String Theory (1996)
- Doctoral advisor: Curtis Callan
- Doctoral students: Henry Lin

Juan Martín Maldacena (Latin American Spanish: [maldaˈsena]; born 10 September 1968) is an Argentine theoretical physicist and the Carl P. Feinberg Professor in the School of Natural Sciences at the Institute for Advanced Study, Princeton. He has made significant contributions to the foundations of string theory and quantum gravity. His most famous discovery is the AdS/CFT correspondence, a realization of the holographic principle in string theory. He has been described by Leonard Susskind as "certainly the greatest theoretical physicist of his generation".

== Biography ==
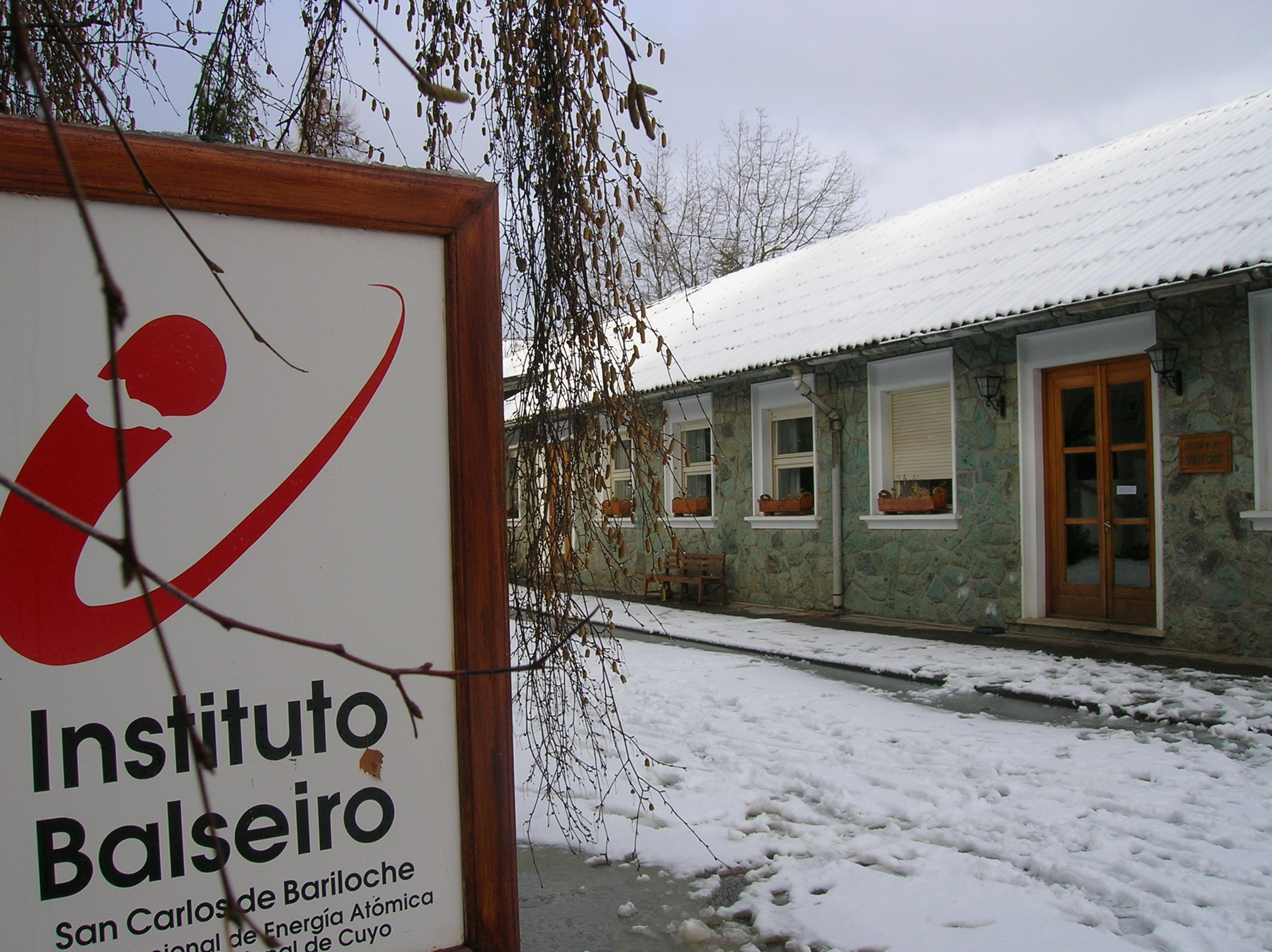
Instituto Balseiro at which Maldacena obtained his Physics licenciatura

Maldacena studied between 1986 and 1988 in the University of Buenos Aires and then moved to Bariloche to obtain his licenciatura (a six-year degree) in 1991 at the Instituto Balseiro, Bariloche, Argentina, under the supervision of Gerardo Aldazábal. He then obtained his Ph.D. in physics at Princeton University after completing a doctoral dissertation titled "Black holes in string theory" under the supervision of Curtis Callan in 1996, and went on to a post-doctoral position at Rutgers University. In 1997, he joined Harvard University as associate professor, being quickly promoted to Professor of Physics in 1999. Since 2001 he has been a professor at the Institute for Advanced Study in Princeton, New Jersey and in 2016 became the first Carl P. Feinberg Professor of Theoretical Physics in the institute's School of Natural Sciences.

Maldacena is a member of the Society of Catholic Scientists.

== Contributions to physics ==
Maldacena has made numerous discoveries in theoretical physics. Leonard Susskind called him "perhaps the greatest physicist of his generation... certainly the greatest theoretical physicist of his generation". His most famous discovery is the most reliable realization of the holographic principle – namely the AdS/CFT correspondence, a conjecture about the equivalence of string theory on Anti-de Sitter (AdS) space, and a conformal field theory defined on the boundary of the AdS space. According to the conjecture, certain theories of quantum gravity are equivalent to other quantum mechanical theories (with no gravitational force) in one fewer spacetime dimensions.

In subsequent works, Maldacena elucidated several aspects of the AdS/CFT correspondence, describing how certain physical observables defined in one theory can be described in the equivalent theory. Shortly after his original work on the AdS/CFT correspondence, Maldacena showed how Wilson lines can be computed in a corresponding string theory by considering the area swept by an evolving fundamental string. Wilson lines are non-local physical observables defined in gauge theory. In 2001, Maldacena proposed that an eternal black hole, an object defined in a gravitational theory, is equivalent to a certain entangled state involving two copies of the corresponding quantum mechanical theory. Ordinary black holes emit Hawking radiation and eventually evaporate. An eternal black hole is a type of black hole that survives forever because it eventually re-absorbs the radiation it emits.

In 2013, Maldacena co-authored an analysis of the 2012 black hole firewall paradox with Leonard Susskind, arguing that the paradox can be resolved if entangled particles are connected by minor wormholes."

== Publications ==
- Berenstein, David; Maldacena, Juan; Nastase, Horatiu (2002). "Strings in flat space and pp waves from N = 4 Super Yang Mills". AIP Conference Proceedings. 646. Waterloo, Ontario (Canada): 3–14. arXiv:hep-th/0202021. Bibcode:2002AIPC..646....3B. doi:10.1063/1.1524550.
- Maldacena, Juan (1 April 1999). "The Large-N Limit of Superconformal Field Theories and Supergravity". International Journal of Theoretical Physics. 38 (4): 1113–1133. arXiv:hep-th/9711200. Bibcode:1999IJTP...38.1113M. doi:10.1023/A:1026654312961. ISSN 1572-9575. Full list of Maldacena's publications and scientific literature content can be found on INSPIRE-HEP and NASA ADS or SciX (Science Explorer database) https://inspirehep.net/authors/999108 https://scixplorer.org/search?p=1&q=author%3A%22Juan+Maldacena

== Awards ==
Maldacena has received these awards:

- Alfred P. Sloan Foundation Fellowship, 1998
- Packard Fellowship in Science and Engineering, 1998
- MacArthur Fellowship, 1999
- UNESCO Husein Prize for Young Scientists, 1999
- Sackler Prize in Physics, 2000
- Xanthopoulos International Award for Research in Gravitational Physics, 2001
- Pius XI Medal, 2002
- Edward A. Bouchet Award of the American Physical Society, 2004
- Member of the American Academy of Arts and Sciences, elected 2007
- Dannie Heineman Prize, 2007
- Dirac Medal of the ICTP, 2008
- Pomeranchuk Prize, 2012
- Breakthrough Prize in Fundamental Physics, 2012.
- Member of the National Academy of Sciences, elected 2013
- Diamond Konex Award as the most important scientist in the last decade in Argentina, 2013
- Lorentz Medal, 2018
- Albert Einstein Medal, 2018
- St. Albert Award, 2018
- Galileo Galilei Medal, 2019
- Les Houches School of Physics prize 2020
