= AIP Conference Proceedings =

- Discipline: Physics
- Language: English

Publication details
- History: 1970 to present
- Publisher: American Institute of Physics (United States)
- Frequency: Irregular

Standard abbreviations
- ISO 4: AIP Conf. Proc.

Indexing
- CODEN: APCPCS
- ISSN: 0094-243X (print); 1551-7616 (web)
- LCCN: 2004214302
- OCLC no.: 45060072

Links
- Journal homepage

AIP Conference Proceedings is a serial published by the American Institute of Physics since 1970. It publishes the proceedings from scientific meetings, including large international conferences and small specialist workshops. Emily Prendergast is the current Manager of AIP Conference Proceedings. In addition to the series' own ISSN, each volumes receives its own ISBN.

AIP Conference Proceedings publishes more than 100 volumes per year, with back-file coverage to 1970 which encompasses 1,330 proceedings volumes and 100,000 published papers.

== Scope ==
Broad subject coverage spans the physical sciences, including physics, math, chemistry, materials science, and engineering.

== Abstracting and indexing ==
This series is indexed in the following databases, amongst others

- Academic Search Premier
- Scitation
- Scopus
- Web of Knowledge
