= Soft hair (black holes) =

Low-energy particles on event horizons

In black hole physics, soft hair is a theorized method of information storage on the event horizon of a black hole and is a potential resolution to the black hole information paradox. Soft hair is made up of zero-energy photons and/or gravitons on the event horizon generated by diffeomorphisms such as supertranslations and superrotations.

== Information paradox ==
In the 1970s, theoretical physicist Stephen Hawking found that black holes are not completely black—they have entropy, and like any blackbody, they consistently emit a small amount of thermal radiation. Hawking predicted that, because the radiation was thermal, it would not be able to carry any information as it was emitted by the black hole. However, semiclassical gravity predicts that black holes have entropy and hold a large number of quantum microstates. Therefore, if black hole evaporation were to truly carry no information, as Hawking found, the information that makes up a black hole would be lost as it evaporates, violating causality. This paradox was named the black hole information paradox.

Soft hair challenges two of the assumptions that create the paradox. Firstly, it asserts that the final vacuum state is not necessarily unique: it may actually be correlated with the thermal Hawking radiation. Secondly, soft hair challenges the no-hair theorem: a theorem stating that black holes are only characterized by their mass, charge, and spin.

== Soft hair ==
Supertranslations and superrotations are two types of diffeomorphisms that map a black hole to a different, physically inequivalent black hole. Charge from supertranslations and superrotations is radiated out of the black hole, and that charge must remained fixed in accordance with conservation. This requires that black holes carry an infinite collection of "soft hair"—zero-energy photons and/or gravitons of at least Planck length—on their horizons. For non-spherically symmetric black holes and BTZ black holes in Anti-deSitter spacetime with a negative, non-vanishing cosmological constant, this hair does not contribute to a black hole's entropy. Charge from supertranslations and superrotations also forces the early and late Hawking radiation to be correlated due to conservation of energy, rather than random as Hawking radiation was originally defined. The distribution of soft hair over a black hole also impacts the spectrum of Hawking radiation.

In their original 2016 paper, Hawking, Strominger, and Perry theorized that the soft hair from supertranslations alone would not be enough to contain all the information stored in a black hole. In two follow-up papers with Haco, they found that additional hair arises on a spinning black hole with or without charge due to a type of diffeomorphism called a "hidden conformal symmetry". This symmetry arises only when a black hole is evaluated in phase space rather than real spacetime, but still produces non-vanishing effects on the black hole's horizon. When the soft hair resulting from hidden conformal symmetry was included, it was enough to contain all the entropy of the black hole.

=== Hair-loss paradox ===
One may assume that the existence of black hole hair nullifies the black hole firewall paradox, since the existence of the hair allows early and late Hawking radiation to be decoupled. However, as a black hole shrinks in size, it must lose hair because the entropy of the hair cannot be greater than the entropy of the black hole. Once the black hole is small enough, its meager amount of hair is not enough to facilitate decoupling, causing a firewall to be formed at the very end of a black hole's lifespan. This has been termed the 'hair-loss paradox'.

== Semiclassical nature of the hair ==
Black hole hair is semiclassical in that it does not require the existence of unproven theories such as supersymmetry or string theory. However, the idea of black hole hair in semiclassical gravity was inspired by existing ideas in string theory, such as fuzzball theory, that argue that a black hole stores all its information holographically on its horizon.

== Testing the no-hair theorem ==
Black hole hair is difficult to detect. Unlike many astrophysical theories, such as gravitational lensing, the no-hair theorem cannot be detected via an analogous, more accessible astronomical object such as the Sun: Unlike on a black hole, which has a horizon, any soft hair on an object like a star would be able to move freely out of the object with no physical effect.

On the other hand, soft hair can be detected within gravitational waves from collisions of existing black holes. However, its effects are too small, as of 2022, to be detectable by existing gravitational wave observatories such as LIGO, Virgo, and KAGRA. Black hole hair could also be detected by observing a black hole, since the presence of hair could slightly vertically shift the shadow, change the shadow's radius by ≤0.2%, or alter the appearance of the accretion disk. However, the impact of superrotations on the hair is not well known, which could pose challenges to researchers trying to confirm the existence of the hair observationally.

== In popular culture ==
The research by Hawking, Strominger, Perry, and Haco for their 2018 paper on the impact of hidden conformal symmetry on soft hair was discussed in the 2020 documentary Black Holes: The Edge of All We Know.

== See also ==
- No-hair theorem
- Hawking radiation
- Black hole information paradox
- Firewall (physics)
- Fuzzball (string theory)
- Black Holes: The Edge of All We Know
