= Black Holes: The Edge of All We Know =

Black hole documentary

- Official film poster
- Directed by: Peter Galison
- Produced by: Peter Galison
- Cinematography: Stephen McCarthy; Allie Humenuk; Tim Cragg
- Edited by: Chlyd King
- Music by: Zoë Keating
- Animation by: Ruth Lingford; Momentist, Inc. Warning Office; Glynnis Fawkes
- Production companies: Collapsar; Sandbox Films
- Release date: 2020
- Running time: 99 minutes
- Country: United States
- Language: English

Black Holes: The Edge of All We Know is a 2020 documentary about the journey of scientists around the world to better understand black holes. The film mainly discusses the Event Horizon Telescope's mission to take the first picture of a black hole and the work of Stephen Hawking, Andrew Strominger, Malcolm Perry and Sasha Haco to resolve the black hole information paradox.

== Synopsis ==
At the Large Millimeter Telescope (LMT) on Sierra Negra, Mexico, scientists working on the Event Horizon Telescope (EHT) discuss how to troubleshoot problems to prepare for the next day's observation. They are working to take the first image of a black hole and have decided to focus their lenses at two: Sagittarius A*, the supermassive black hole in the center of the Milky Way galaxy, and the M87*, the Messier 87 galaxy's supermassive black hole. These observations are a tedious process because many observatories all around the globe have to observe simultaneously and may face setbacks, such as weather problems. After five full days of recording, collecting a total of 1.5 petabytes of data per day, the EHT teams are done with all of their observations of Sagittarius A*.

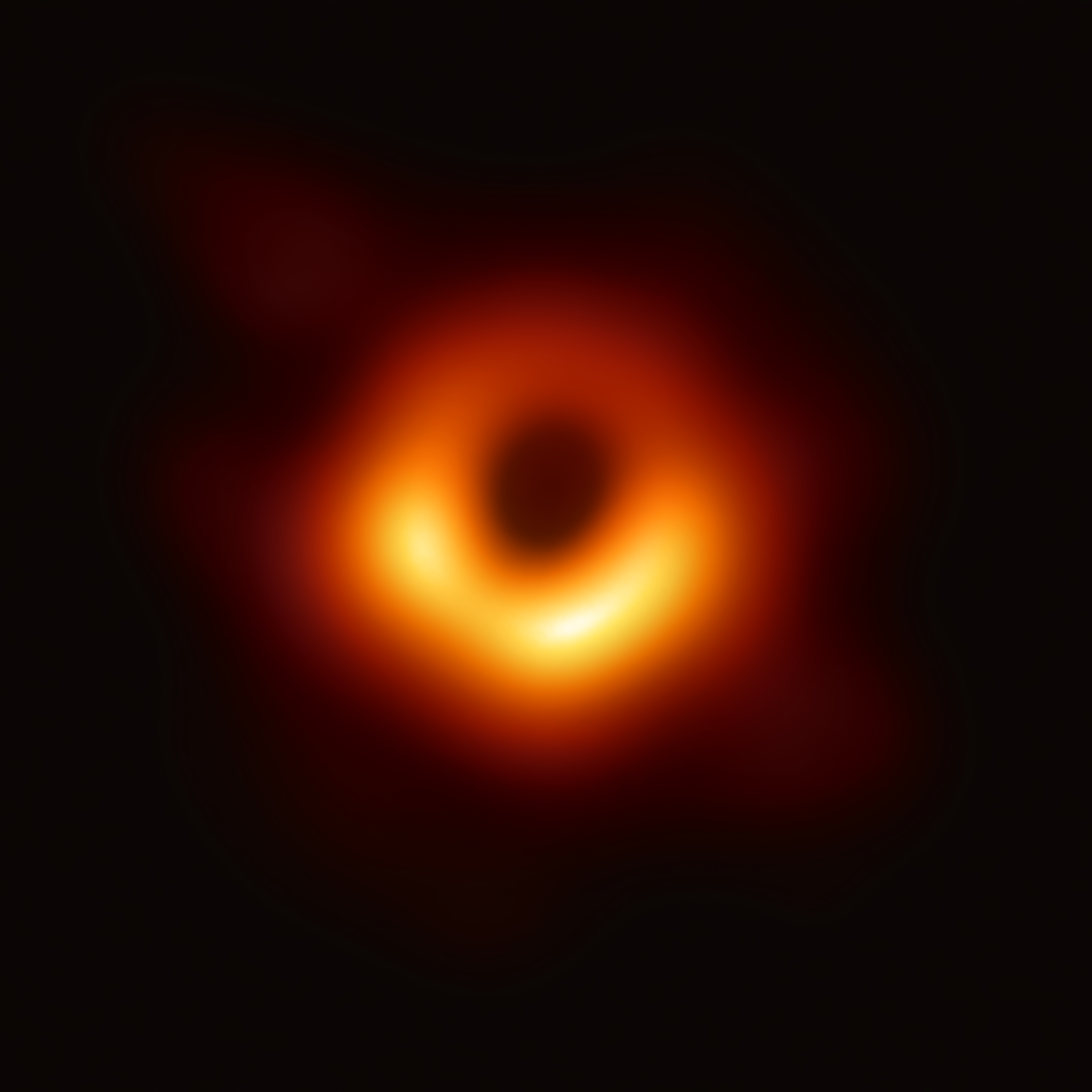
The finalized image of Messier 87* created by the Event Horizon Telescope team.

After collecting the data, the EHT team must analyze it. To avoid problems of bias, the analysis team has been split into four groups, each of whom cannot see what the other groups are working on. Analysts, including computer scientist and engineer Katie Bouman, work on imaging algorithms to combine the data from the different telescopes into one cohesive image. After some time, each member of each team generates their own images and they compare and analyze their pictures to refine and combine their ideas into a single image while still keeping everything secret from the other teams. After each team has created their own image, they meet at a workshop to compare their four images, using an algorithm to determine the images' similarity. Finally, on April 10, 2019, the EHT collaboration reveals the first image of a black hole to the whole world.

Meanwhile, Andrew Strominger, Malcolm Perry, and Sasha Haco discuss Hawking radiation and the black hole information paradox. They have been working with Stephen Hawking on a potential solution to the paradox. Strominger, Perry, and Haco go to a house to meet with Hawking and discuss their potential solution: Specific diffeomorphisms create additional degrees of freedom on the black hole's horizon, which they term soft hair. They are trying to see if the soft hair's charge will be enough to contain all the entropy of a black hole as predicted by Bekenstein and Hawking. Despite the difficulty of solving the paradox, they are optimistic about their chances. Unfortunately, while they are still working on the problem, Hawking dies. Despite this setback, they still manage to make progress by using computers and new approaches to refine the equation they are using to calculate the total information storage of the soft hair. Finally, they finish solving their equation and publish their paper, determining that soft hair can indeed store all of the information inside a black hole.

Between the dual storylines of the EHT collaboration and the scientists working on soft hair, other work in black hole physics is discussed, including water-based simulations and LIGO's work on gravitational waves.

== Production ==
Filming began in 2015 and lasted for five years. Director Peter Galison aimed to create a scientific documentary demonstrating just how collaborative science is. He wanted to push back against the narrative of individual genius by demonstrating that collaboration in science is immensely important in making progress. He also wanted to show science being actively done rather than just presented to a crowd. In particular, he wanted to show Stephen Hawking actively working on science, since he had become such an iconic figure to the public yet had rarely been shown at work.

In addition to filming researchers studying black holes, the film also uses a variety of artistic techniques, interspersing filmed footage with black-and-white 2D animation, graphic novel sequences, and physical models. The film also combines science with philosophical questions, such as the mysterious nature of black holes and the desire to see beyond the event horizon.

== Reception ==
Reception for Black Holes: The Edge of All We Know was generally positive. Reviewers praised the film for its depiction of scientists at work and the film's visual and artistic choices, such as the interspersed black-and-white 2D animated sequences. However, the film was criticized for its minimal explanation of the theory behind the scientists' work and the lack of cohesion between storylines.
