= Patrick Hayden (scientist) =

Canadian physicist

Patrick Hayden is a Canadian physicist and computer scientist active in the fields of quantum information theory and quantum computing. He is currently a professor in the Stanford University physics department and a distinguished research chair at the Perimeter Institute for Theoretical Physics. Prior to that he held a Canada Research Chair in the physics of information at McGill University. He received a B.Sc. (1998) from McGill University and won a Rhodes Scholarship to study for a D.Phil. (2001) at the University of Oxford under the supervision of Artur Ekert. In 2007 he was awarded the Sloan Research Fellowship in Computer Science. He was a Canadian Mathematical Society Public Lecturer in 2008 and received a Simons Investigator Award in 2014. Since 2015 he has been the director of the It from Qubit: Simons Collaboration on Quantum Fields, Gravity and Information.

Hayden has contributed substantially to quantum information theory. His contributions range from quantum information approaches to the theory of black holes to the study of quantum entanglement. Hayden and John Preskill considered information retrieval from evaporating black holes. Their study of a black hole's retention time for quantum information before it is revealed in the Hawking radiation; called the Hayden-Preskill thought experiment, turned out to be compatible with the black hole complementarity hypothesis.
