= Patrick Hayden =

Patrick Hayden may refer to:

- Patrick Nielsen Hayden, author and editor of science fiction
- Patrick Hayden (scientist), physicist and information theorist
