= Hayden–Preskill thought experiment =

Thought experiment about black hole information paradox

In quantum information, the Hayden–Preskill thought experiment (also known as the Hayden–Preskill protocol) is a thought experiment that investigates the black hole information paradox by hypothesizing on how long it takes to decode information thrown in a black hole from its Hawking radiation.

The thought experiment concerning Alice and Bob is as follows: Alice throws a k qubit quantum state into a black hole that is entangled with Bob's quantum computer. Bob collects the Hawking radiation emitted by the black hole and feeds it into his quantum computer where he applies the appropriate quantum gates that will decode Alice's state. Bob only needs at least k qubits from the black hole's Hawking radiation to decode Alice's quantum state.

The black hole can be thought of as a quantum information mirror, because it returns scrambled information almost instantly, with a delay that can be accounted for by the scrambling time and the time it takes for the black hole to radiate the qubits. This decoding method, known as the Yoshida-Kitaev decoding scheme, can theoretically be applied to a small system thermalized with a large system. This opens up the possibility of testing the Hayden–Preskill thought experiment in real life.

== Models ==
Outlined below are models used to explore the Hayden–Preskill thought experiment.

=== Toy model for heavy and soft modes ===
Non-symmetric modes with low energy are called soft, while modes with high energy are called heavy. Using energy conservation and a toy model, it becomes clear that Hawking radiation corresponds to heavy modes classically. Only soft modes correspond to the Hayden–Preskill protocol. The toy-model relies on a clear distinction between heavy and soft modes based on thermodynamics properties, energy, and charge.

=== Dicke models ===
In order to physically represent the Hayden–Preskill Protocol Dicke models can be used. Using a system of two Dicke models, it was found that when data is thrown into a black hole the initial spin information can be read after it has been scrambled into the cavity. In a single system, information scrambling prevents the ability to decode the information; however, if a thermofield double state is used, the scrambling of information allows for the initial state information to be read. Therefore, efficiency for decoding is at its maximum when scrambling is fastest, and when the system is most chaotic.

== Decoding fidelity ==
If decoding fidelity is a constant, the black hole will act similarly to a mirror and reflect back any information that falls into it almost immediately. However, if experiments could be conducted the Hayden–Preskill protocol would result in some information loss. Recall that in decoding information from the black hole we need the early radiation that will be called B' and the late radiation that will be called D, to reconstruct the original state A. There is an error that emerges from storing early radiation B'. Qubits may be randomly lost while being stored. Additionally, the early radiation and the black hole are initially maximally entangled, but decoherence emerges over time. Ultimately, the information loss due to erasure in storage is much more impactful than the decoherence, because information loss from decoherence can be partially recovered with an understanding of entanglement.

== Black hole complementarity and firewalls ==
The Hayden–Preskill thought experiment implies that information that falls into a black hole can be recovered via the Hawking radiation, which raises the question: does the information that falls into a black hole fall in or radiate out? One approach to this is the concept of black hole complementarity, which claims that an observer orbiting a black hole observes the information radiating out as Hawking radiation, while an observer that falls into the black hole observes the information falling inward. This does not seem to violate the no cloning principle of quantum mechanics since you can only measure one or the other; if you fall into a black hole and measure a qubit, you can't leave and then measure the Hawking radiation. Black hole complementarity has four basic postulates:

1. Hawking radiation is in a pure state. The black hole can be thought of as a quantum operator, which takes the quantum state of the original mass and converts it into the quantum state of the Hawking radiation, as viewed by a distant observer.
2. Outside of the black hole's event horizon, semi-classical field equations remain valid.
3. A black hole is a quantum system with discrete energy levels, as viewed by a distant observer.
4. A free falling observer encounters nothing unique or strange; passing the event horizon is not marked by observable phenomena intrinsic to the horizon itself.

According to Almheiri, Marolf, Polchinski, and Sully postulates 1, 2, and 4 feature a contradiction. Say we divide the Hawking radiation leaving the black hole into two time frames: one "early," and one "late." Because the Hawking radiation is a pure state based on the quantum wave function of the original mass, the late Hawking radiation must be entangled with the early Hawking radiation. However, black hole complementarity also implies that the outgoing Hawking radiation is entangled with the information inside the black hole. This violates what is known as "monogamy of entanglement," the idea that a quantum system can only be entangled with one other quantum system. To fix this problem, either postulate 2 or postulate 4 must be false: if postulate 2 is false, then there must be some exotic dynamics extending beyond the event horizon that resolve this conflict; if postulate 4 is false, then the entanglement of the inner and outer information must be broken, leading to the creation of high-energy modes. These high-energy modes create a "firewall" that burns up anything that enters the black hole.
