= Ahmed Almheiri =

Emirati theoretical physicist

- أحمد المهيري
- Born: 1986 (age 39–40)
- Citizenship: United Arab Emirates
- Education: University of Toronto (B.Sc/B.A, 2008); University of California - Santa Barbara (M.A, 2010); University of California, Santa Barbara (Ph.D, 2014)
- Awards: Mohammed bin Rashid Knowledge Award (2024); New Horizons in Physics Prize (2021); Pride of Emirates medal (2020); Lancaster Dissertation Award (2014)
- Scientific career
- Fields: Theoretical physics
- Institutions: New York University Abu Dhabi; Institute for Advanced Study; Stanford University
- Thesis: The Black Hole Firewall and Top-Down Constructions of AdS/CFT (2014)
- Doctoral advisor: Joseph Polchinski

Ahmed Almheiri (Arabic: أحمد المهيري) is an Emirati theoretical physicist. He is currently an assistant professor of physics at New York University Abu Dhabi, Saadiyat Island. He is known for his works on the AdS/CFT correspondence, black hole information paradox and black hole firewalls.

== Education and career ==
Ahmed completed his undergraduate studies from University of Toronto in 2008. He obtained his Ph.D in physics from University of California, Santa Barbara in 2014 under the supervision of Joseph Polchinski. His thesis titled The Black Hole Firewall and Top-Down Constructions of AdS/CFT was awarded the Winifred and Louis Lancaster Dissertation Award in 2014. He has held postdoctoral positions at Stanford University (2014–17) where he worked on the realization of the AdS/CFT correspondence as a quantum error correction code, and at the Institute for Advanced Study (2017–22) during which he made contributions to calculating the entropy for the radiation of a black hole. He joined New York University Abu Dhabi as a faculty member in 2022.

== Awards ==
Ahmed was jointly awarded the New Horizons in Physics Prize by the Fundamental Physics Prize Foundation in 2021 for "calculating the quantum information of a black hole and its radiation". He was awarded the Pride of Emirates medal in 2020 by His Highness Sheikh Mohammed Bin Rashid Al Maktoum. In November 2024, he was jointly awarded the Mohammed bin Rashid Knowledge Award (MBRKA) by the Mohammed bin Rashid Al Maktoum Foundation.

== Research publications ==
A list of Ahmed's research publications can be found in the INSPIRE HEP database.

== Books ==
Ahmed served as an editor for the autobiographical memoir Memories of a Theoretical Physicist by Joseph Polchinski.
