= Information loss =

Information loss may refer to:

- Data loss in information systems
  - lossy compression
  - Digital obsolescence
- Black hole information paradox in theoretical physics
