= The Cosmic Landscape =

Book by Leonard Susskind

- Hardcover edition
- Author: Leonard Susskind
- Language: English
- Subject: Physics
- Genre: Non-fiction
- Publisher: Little, Brown and Company
- Publication date: December 12, 2005
- Publication place: United States
- Media type: Print
- Pages: 416 pages
- ISBN: 978-0316155793
- Followed by: The Black Hole War

The Cosmic Landscape is a non-fiction popular science book on the anthropic principle and string theory landscape. It is written by theoretical physicist Leonard Susskind. The book was initially published by Little, Brown and Company on December 12, 2005.

== Background ==
At the time the book was written, it had been noted that the conditions of the Universe are very fine tuned, allowing life. However, at the same time it is unknown why. The Anthropic principle was one solution, but was rejected by many physicists who preferred a more elegant solution. String theory was then created, but allowed too many solutions. Then, in the book, Susskind hypothesized that there are multiverses where there are occasional universes where life is indeed possible. He calls this multiverse the "landscape".

== Contents ==
Susskind writes in the preface that the book is mainly about "the scientific explanations of the apparent miracles of physics and cosmology and its philosophical implications". The book deals with the Anthropic principle. The earlier chapters deal with topics such as quantum electrodynamics, Feynman diagrams and quantum chromodynamics. Later on, the cosmological constant is introduced and problems with the amount of energy produced from virtual particles. String theory is also introduced and the black hole war.

The book emphasizes the theory of a "landscape" with many universes out there. Instead of the fact that the Universe is somehow just perfect for life, the truth is that "it's not that the universe is somehow contorting itself to accommodate us; it's just a diverse place and we find ourselves in a friendly corner".

== Critical reception ==
The book has received favorable critical reception. Choice Review praised the way the "nuances" are presented and called the book "a stimulating, semi-popular book that presents an excellent, descriptive tutorial of modern physics and cosmology". Booklist noted that the book was "of utmost significance to science readers" and how "in this extraordinary work, Susskind ushers us to the mind-bending edge of a possible paradigm shift". Publishers Weekly claimed that Susskind was able to guide readers to the anthropic principle. The reviewer then stated that "persistent readers will finish this book understanding and caring about contemporary physics in ways both unexpected and gratifying". Library Journal said that the book is able to explain String Theory and how it can unite general relativity and quantum mechanics together. The reviewer recommended the book to "science collections in academic and larger public libraries".

According to Paul Langacker, a professor at the University of Pennsylvania, concerning the "debate between the landscape idea and the more traditional view":

Leonard Susskind’s The Cosmic Landscape: String Theory and the Illusion of Intelligent Design surveys the new debate clearly and amusingly for the general reader. Susskind, one of the inventors of string theory and a leading advocate of the landscape and multiverse ideas, does an excellent job developing the necessary background in quantum mechanics, relativity, particle physics, supersymmetry, string theory, black holes, cosmology, and inflation.

== See also ==
- The 4 Percent Universe
