= Black ring =

Black ring may refer to:

- a ring with a black gemstone
- black ring, a 5-dimensional solution, see higher-dimensional Einstein gravity
- Black-ringed white-eye
- Tomato black ring virus
- the Black Ring, a magic ring from Conan the Adventurer
- Black power ring of the Black Lantern Corps
- the rings of power of the Nazgûl
- a black ring worn on the right middle finger as a symbol of the asexual community

== See also ==
- Horrors of the Black Ring
