= The Black Hole War =

Book by Leonard Susskind

Black Hole War: My Battle with Stephen Hawking to Make the World Safe for Quantum Mechanics
- Softcover edition
- Author: Leonard Susskind
- Language: English
- Subject: Black hole, string theory
- Genre: Popular science
- Publisher: Little, Brown and Company
- Publication date: July 7, 2008
- Publication place: United States
- Media type: Print, e-book, audiobook
- Pages: 480 pp.
- ISBN: 978-0316016407
- Preceded by: The Cosmic Landscape
- Followed by: The Theoretical Minimum

The Black Hole War: My Battle with Stephen Hawking to Make the World Safe for Quantum Mechanics is a 2008 popular science book by American theoretical physicist Leonard Susskind. The book covers the black hole information paradox, and the related scientific dispute between Stephen Hawking and Susskind. Susskind is known for his work on string theory and wrote a previous popular science book, The Cosmic Landscape, in 2005.

== Overview ==
Hawking proposed that information is lost in black holes, and not preserved in Hawking radiation. Susskind disagreed, arguing that Hawking's conclusions violated one of the most basic scientific laws of the universe, the conservation of information. As Susskind depicts in his book, The Black Hole War was a "genuine scientific controversy" between scientists favoring an emphasis on the principles of relativity against those in favor of quantum mechanics. The debate led to the holographic principle, proposed by Gerard 't Hooft and refined by Susskind, which suggested that the information is in fact preserved, stored on the boundary of a system.

== Reception ==
Sean M. Carroll in the Wall Street Journal praised the book for successfully explaining the topic in a way that lay readers could understand, despite the difficulty of the subject. Carroll writes that the book contains a "wealth of anecdotes", and that Susskind's "wit and storytelling abilities ... are pleasantly on display in" the book. George Johnson of The New York Times was critical of the beginning of the book, writing that the introduction on the basic concepts of relativity and quantum mechanics was excessive, especially for readers who have already read other popular science books on theoretical physics. Time Magazine's Lev Grossman gave the book a B+, saying that "you could dismiss it all as nerd-on-nerd violence, but then you'd miss out on Susskind explaining why the universe is actually a hologram." Jesse Cohen of the Los Angeles Times criticized the book for its "tendency to meander" with personal anecdotes, although the book "glows with the warmth of conversation." The New Scientist included the book on its 2008 editor's picks list and the Washington Post listed it as one of the best books of 2008 in their annual holiday shopping guide.

== See also ==
- Thorne–Hawking–Preskill bet
