= Joseph Polchinski =

American theoretical physicist and string theorist (1954–2018)

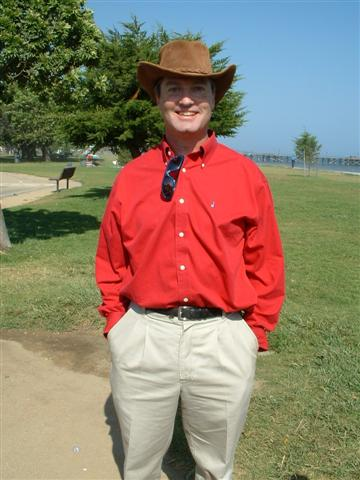
- Polchinski in 2004
- Born: May 16, 1954; White Plains, New York, U.S.
- Died: February 2, 2018 (aged 63); Santa Barbara, California, U.S.
- Education: California Institute of Technology (BS); University of California, Berkeley (PhD)
- Known for: Polchinski equation Polchinski's paradox D-branes; Black hole firewall Everett phone
- Awards: Dannie Heineman Prize (2007); Dirac Medal (2008); Breakthrough Prize (2017)
- Scientific career
- Fields: Theoretical physics
- Workplaces: University of California, Santa Barbara
- Thesis: Vortex Operators in gauge field theories (1980)
- Doctoral advisor: Stanley Mandelstam
- Doctoral students: Ahmed Almheiri; Robert Leigh

Joseph Gerard Polchinski Jr. (/poʊlˈtʃɪnski/; May 16, 1954 – February 2, 2018) was an American theoretical physicist and string theorist.

== Biography ==
Polchinski was born in White Plains, New York, the elder of two children to Joseph Gerard Polchinski Sr., a financial consultant and manager, and Joan (née Thornton), an office worker and homemaker. Polchinski was primarily of Irish descent with his paternal grandfather being Polish.

Polchinski graduated from Canyon del Oro High School in Tucson, Arizona, in 1971. He obtained his B.S. degree from Caltech in 1975, and his Ph.D. from the University of California, Berkeley, in 1980 under the supervision of Stanley Mandelstam. He did not publish any papers as a graduate student. After postdoctoral positions at SLAC (1980–82) and Harvard (1982–84) he was a professor at the University of Texas at Austin from 1984 to 1992. From 1992 to March 2017 he was a professor in the Physics Department at the University of California, Santa Barbara and a permanent member of the Kavli Institute for Theoretical Physics there.

== Contributions ==
Polchinski wrote the two-volume textbook String Theory, published in 1998. He is best known for the development of D-branes. In 2008 he won the Dirac Medal for his work in superstring theory. He was awarded the 2017 Breakthrough Prize in Fundamental Physics in recognition of his contributions to theoretical physics.

=== D-branes ===
Polchinski's contributions to D-brane physics were a primary trigger of the second superstring revolution and the physics of holographic gauge-gravity dualities. After co-discovering D-branes in 1989, his 1995 work conjectured and partially demonstrated the equivalence between D-branes and black p-branes. The duality between these objects was soon understood to be a demonstration of holography, in which a theory of quantum gravity (the black p-branes) is equivalent to a lower-dimensional theory without gravity (the D-branes), as later demonstrated in Maldacena's AdS/CFT duality.

=== Polchinski's paradox ===
Polchinski's paradox: a billiard ball travels back in time and prevents itself from traveling back in time

In an unpublished communication to Kip Thorne circa 1990, commenting on the Novikov self-consistency principle (in relation to sending objects or people through a traversable wormhole into the past, and the time paradoxes that could result), Polchinski raised a potentially paradoxical situation involving a billiard ball which passes through a wormhole which sends it back in time. In this scenario, the ball is fired into a wormhole at an angle such that it exits the wormhole in the past at just the right angle to collide with its earlier self, thereby knocking it off course and preventing it from entering the wormhole in the first place. Thorne dubbed this problem "Polchinski's paradox" in 1994.

Later students of the whimsical problem developed solutions which avoid inconsistencies by having the ball emerge from the future at a different angle than the one used to generate the paradox and deliver its past self a glancing blow instead of knocking it completely away from the wormhole, which changes its trajectory in just the right way so that it travels back in time with the angle required to deliver this glancing blow to its past self. (It is also possible that the ball that exits the wormhole knocks its past self off course from the wormhole completely. Even with the original ball being knocked off course the future ball could bounce off the original ball and enter the wormhole again, closing the paradox. The ball that entered the wormhole will always enter the wormhole creating an infinite loop.)

=== 2012 paper on black holes ===
In July 2012, Polchinski and two of his students, James Sully and Ahmed Almheiri, along with Donald Marolf, published a paper whose calculations about black hole radiation suggested that either general relativity's equivalence principle is wrong, or else a key tenet of quantum mechanics is incorrect.

== Personal life and death ==
Polchinski had two sons, Steven and Daniel, with his wife, Dorothy Maria Chun, whom he married in 1980.

He died at his home in Santa Barbara, California on February 2, 2018, of brain cancer, at the age of 63.

== Bibliography ==
- Polchinski, Joseph (1998a), String Theory Vol. I: An Introduction to the Bosonic String, Cambridge University Press, ISBN 0-521-63303-6
- Polchinski, Joseph (1998b), String Theory Vol. II: Superstring Theory and Beyond, Cambridge University Press, ISBN 0-521-63304-4
- Polchinski, Joseph (2017), "Memories of a Theoretical Physicist", arXiv:1708.09093 [physics.hist-ph]. Autobiographical memoir.
