= Black hole complementarity =

Conjectured solution to the black hole information paradox

Black hole complementarity is a conjectured solution to the black hole information paradox, proposed by Leonard Susskind, Lárus Thorlacius, John Uglum, and Gerard 't Hooft.

== Overview ==
Ever since Stephen Hawking suggested information is lost in an evaporating black hole once it passes through the event horizon and is inevitably destroyed at the singularity, and that this can turn pure quantum states into mixed states, some physicists have wondered if a complete theory of quantum gravity might be able to conserve information with a unitary time evolution. But how can this be possible if information cannot escape the event horizon without traveling faster than light? This seems to rule out Hawking radiation as the carrier of the missing information. It also appears as if information cannot be "reflected" at the event horizon as there is nothing special about the horizon locally.

Leonard Susskind, Lárus Thorlacius, and John Uglum proposed a radical resolution to this problem by claiming that the information is both reflected at the event horizon and passes through the event horizon and cannot escape, with the catch being no observer can confirm both stories simultaneously. According to an external observer, the infinite time dilation at the horizon itself makes it appear as if it takes an infinite amount of time to reach the horizon. They also postulated a stretched horizon, which is a membrane hovering about a Planck length outside the event horizon and which is both physical and hot. According to the external observer, infalling information heats up the stretched horizon, which then reradiates it as Hawking radiation, with the entire evolution being unitary. However, according to an infalling observer, nothing special happens at the event horizon itself, and both the observer and the information will hit the singularity. This isn't to say there are two copies of the information lying about — one at or just outside the horizon, and the other inside the black hole — as that would violate the no-cloning theorem. Instead, an observer can only detect the information at the horizon itself, or inside, but never both simultaneously. Complementarity is a feature of the quantum mechanics of noncommuting observables, and both stories are complementary in the quantum sense, that there is no contradiction which also means no violation of linearity in quantum mechanics.

An infalling observer will see the point of entry of the information as being localized on the event horizon, while an external observer will notice the information being spread out uniformly over the entire stretched horizon before being re-radiated, and perceives the event horizon as a dynamical membrane.

To an infalling observer, information and entropy pass through the horizon with nothing of interest happening. To an external observer, the information and entropy is absorbed into the stretched horizon which acts like a dissipative fluid with entropy, viscosity and electrical conductivity. See the membrane paradigm for more details. The stretched horizon is conducting with surface charges which rapidly spread out logarithmically over the horizon.

=== Fast scrambling and non-local dynamics ===
A central element of the modern view of the stretched horizon is its role as an incredibly fast and efficient information scrambler. When a quantum bit of information falls onto the stretched horizon, it is not simply held at a specific location. Instead, the dynamics of the horizon's degrees of freedom rapidly delocalize this information, spreading it throughout the entire surface in a process known as quantum scrambling. According to conjectures by Patrick Hayden, John Preskill, Yasuhiro Sekino, and Leonard Susskind, black holes are the fastest scramblers in nature. The characteristic time for this to occur, known as the scrambling time ($t_s$), is remarkably short:

$$t_s = \frac{\beta}{2\pi} \log S$$

where $\beta$ is the inverse Hawking temperature and $S$ is the Bekenstein-Hawking entropy. For a large black hole, this logarithmic dependence on entropy makes the scrambling time much faster than any classical process.

Crucially, this rapid scrambling necessitates that the dynamics on the stretched horizon must be profoundly non-local. A standard local quantum field theory, where interactions only occur between neighboring points, would spread information diffusively, with a timescale proportional to the square of the system's size ($t \sim R^2$, where $R$ is the black hole radius). This is far too slow to account for the $\log S$ scrambling time. The implication is that the degrees of freedom on the stretched horizon do not behave like simple quantum fields; instead, every degree of freedom must effectively interact with every other degree of freedom simultaneously, in an "all-to-all" manner. This non-local behavior is required to explain how a qubit dropped at one point can have its information encoded in correlations across the entire horizon in such a short time.

This picture of a non-locally interacting membrane is supported by studies of the Sachdev-Ye-Kitaev model (SYK model), a toy model of quantum mechanics that features all-to-all random interactions. The SYK model exhibits maximal quantum chaos and saturates the bound on the scrambling time, making it a valuable theoretical laboratory for understanding the dynamics of the stretched horizon. The non-local scrambling is a key ingredient in resolving aspects of the black hole information paradox, as it provides a mechanism for transferring information from infalling matter to the horizon's degrees of freedom, allowing it to be subsequently encoded in outgoing Hawking radiation in a unitary fashion.

It has been suggested that validity of effective field theory near the horizon combined with the monogamy of entanglement implies the existence of an AMPS "firewall", where high energy, short wavelength photons are present in the horizon.
