= Firewall (physics) =

Hypothetical black-hole event-horizon phenomenon

A black hole firewall is a hypothetical phenomenon where an observer falling into a black hole encounters high-energy quanta at (or near) the event horizon. The "firewall" phenomenon was proposed in 2012 by physicists Ahmed Almheiri, Donald Marolf, Joseph Polchinski, and James Sully as a possible solution to an apparent inconsistency in black hole complementarity. The proposal is sometimes referred to as the AMPS firewall, an acronym for the names of the authors of the 2012 paper. The potential inconsistency pointed out by AMPS had been pointed out earlier by Samir Mathur who used the argument in favour of the fuzzball proposal. The use of a firewall to resolve this inconsistency remains controversial, with physicists divided as to the solution to the paradox.

== The motivating paradox ==
According to quantum field theory in curved spacetime, a single emission of Hawking radiation involves two mutually entangled particles. The outgoing particle escapes and is emitted as a quantum of Hawking radiation; the infalling particle is swallowed by the black hole. Assume that a black hole formed a finite time in the past and will fully evaporate away in some finite time in the future. Then, it will only emit a finite amount of information encoded within its Hawking radiation. For an old black hole that has crossed the half-way point of evaporation, general arguments from quantum-information theory by Page and Lubkin suggest that the new Hawking radiation must be entangled with the old Hawking radiation. However, since the new Hawking radiation must also be entangled with degrees of freedom behind the horizon, this creates a paradox: a principle called "monogamy of entanglement" requires that, like any quantum system, the outgoing particle cannot be fully entangled with two independent systems at the same time; yet here the outgoing particle appears to be entangled with both the infalling particle and, independently, with past Hawking radiation.

AMPS initially argued that to resolve the paradox physicists may eventually be forced to give up one of three time-tested principles: Einstein's equivalence principle, unitarity, or existing quantum field theory. However, it is now accepted that an additional tacit assumption in the monogamy paradox was that of locality. A common view is that theories of quantum gravity do not obey exact locality, which leads to a resolution of the paradox. On the other hand, some physicists argue that such violations of locality cannot resolve the paradox.

=== The "firewall" resolution to the paradox ===
Some scientists suggest that the entanglement must somehow get immediately broken between the infalling particle and the outgoing particle. Removing the cross-horizon entanglement required for the freely falling vacuum generally turns the horizon into an excited state. Because near-horizon modes can have arbitrarily short wavelengths and large local frequencies, those excitations may carry an extremely large local energy density. This resolution requires a violation of Einstein's equivalence principle, which states that free-falling is indistinguishable from floating in empty space. This violation has been characterized as "outrageous"; theoretical physicist Raphael Bousso has complained that "a firewall simply can't appear in empty space, any more than a brick wall can suddenly appear in an empty field and smack you in the face."

=== Non-firewall resolutions to the paradox ===
Some scientists suggest that there is in fact no entanglement between the emitted particle and previous Hawking radiation. This resolution would require black hole information loss, a controversial violation of unitarity.

Others, such as Steve Giddings, suggest modifying quantum field theory so that entanglement would be gradually lost as the outgoing and infalling particles separate, resulting in a more gradual release of energy inside the black hole, and consequently no firewall.

The Papadodimas–Raju proposal posited that the interior of the black hole was described by the same degrees of freedom as the Hawking radiation. This resolves the monogamy paradox by identifying the two systems that the late Hawking radiation is entangled with. Since, in this proposal, these systems are the same, there is no contradiction with the monogamy of entanglement. Along similar lines, Juan Maldacena and Leonard Susskind suggested in the ER=EPR proposal that the outgoing and infalling particles are somehow connected by wormholes, and therefore are not independent systems.

The fuzzball picture resolves the dilemma by replacing the 'no-hair' vacuum with a stringy quantum state, thus explicitly coupling any outgoing Hawking radiation with the formation history of the black hole.

Stephen Hawking received widespread mainstream media coverage in January 2014 with an informal proposal to replace the event horizon of a black hole with an "apparent horizon" where infalling matter is suspended and then released; however, some scientists have expressed confusion about what precisely is being proposed and how the proposal would solve the paradox.

== Characteristics and detection ==
The firewall would exist at the black hole's event horizon, and would be invisible to observers outside the event horizon. Matter passing through the event horizon into the black hole would immediately be "burned to a crisp" by an arbitrarily hot "seething maelstrom of particles" at the firewall.

In a merger of two black holes, the characteristics of a firewall (if any) may leave a mark on the outgoing gravitational radiation as "echoes" when waves bounce in the vicinity of the fuzzy event horizon. The expected quantity of such echoes is theoretically unclear, as physicists don't currently have a good physical model of firewalls. In 2016, cosmologist Niayesh Afshordi and others argued there were tentative signs of some such echo in the data from the first black hole merger detected by LIGO; more recent work has argued there is no statistically significant evidence for such echoes in the data.

== See also ==
- Black hole information paradox
- Black hole thermodynamics
- Photon sphere
- Gravitational time dilation
- Magnetospheric eternally collapsing object
