= No-hair theorem =

Black holes are characterized only by mass, charge, and spin

The no-hair theorem, also known as the black hole uniqueness theorem, states that all stationary black hole solutions of the Einstein–Maxwell equations of gravitation and electromagnetism in general relativity can be completely characterized by only three independent externally observable classical parameters: mass, angular momentum, and electric charge. Other characteristics (such as geometry and magnetic moment) are uniquely determined by these three parameters, and all other information (for which "hair" is a metaphor) about the matter that formed a black hole or is falling into it "disappears" behind the black-hole event horizon and is therefore permanently inaccessible to external observers after the black hole "settles down" (by emitting gravitational and electromagnetic waves). Physicist John Archibald Wheeler expressed this idea with the phrase "black holes have no hair", which was the origin of the name.

In a later interview, Wheeler said that Jacob Bekenstein coined this phrase.

Richard Feynman objected to the phrase that seemed to me to best symbolize the finding of one of the graduate students: graduate student Jacob Bekenstein had shown that a black hole reveals nothing outside it of what went in, in the way of spinning electric particles. It might show electric charge, yes; mass, yes; but no other features – or as he put it, "A black hole has no hair". Richard Feynman thought that was an obscene phrase and he didn't want to use it. But that is a phrase now often used to state this feature of black holes, that they don't indicate any other properties other than a charge and angular momentum and mass.

The first version of the no-hair theorem for the simplified case of the uniqueness of the Schwarzschild metric was shown by Werner Israel in 1967. The result was quickly generalized to the cases of charged or spinning black holes. There is still no rigorous mathematical proof of a general no-hair theorem, and mathematicians refer to it as the no-hair conjecture. Even in the case of gravity alone (i.e., zero electric fields), the conjecture has only been partially resolved by results of Stephen Hawking, Brandon Carter, and David C. Robinson, under the additional hypothesis of non-degenerate event horizons and the technical, restrictive and difficult-to-justify assumption of real analyticity of the space-time continuum.

== Example ==
Suppose two black holes have the same masses, electrical charges, and angular momenta, but the first black hole was made by collapsing ordinary matter whereas the second was made out of antimatter; nevertheless, then the conjecture states they will be completely indistinguishable to an observer outside the event horizon. None of the special particle physics pseudo-charges (i.e., the global charges baryonic number, leptonic number, etc., all of which would be different for the originating masses of matter that created the black holes) are conserved in the black hole, or if they are conserved somehow then their values would be unobservable from the outside.

== Changing the reference frame ==
Every isolated unstable black hole decays rapidly to a stable black hole; and (excepting quantum fluctuations) stable black holes can be completely described at any moment in time by these eleven numbers (at spatial infinity):

- mass–energy $M$,
- electric charge $Q$,
- position $\textbf{X}$ (three components),
- linear momentum $\textbf{P}$ (three components),
- angular momentum $\textbf{J}$ (three components).

These numbers represent the conserved attributes of an object which can be determined from a distance by examining its gravitational and electromagnetic fields. All other variations in the black hole will either escape to infinity or be swallowed up by the black hole.

By changing the reference frame one can set the linear momentum and position to zero and orient the spin angular momentum along the positive z axis. This eliminates eight of the eleven numbers, leaving three which are independent of the reference frame: mass, angular momentum magnitude, and electric charge. Thus any black hole that has been isolated for a significant period of time can be described by the Kerr–Newman metric in an appropriately chosen reference frame.

== Extensions ==
The no-hair theorem was originally formulated for black holes within the context of a four-dimensional spacetime, obeying the Einstein field equation of general relativity with zero cosmological constant, in the presence of electromagnetic fields, or optionally other fields such as scalar fields and massive vector fields (Proca fields, etc.).

It has since been extended to include the case where the cosmological constant is positive (which recent observations are tending to support).

Magnetic charge, if detected as predicted by some theories, would form the fourth parameter possessed by a classical black hole.

== Counterexamples ==
Counterexamples in which the theorem fails are known in spacetime dimensions higher than four; in the presence of non-abelian Yang–Mills fields, non-abelian Proca fields, some non-minimally coupled scalar fields, or skyrmions; or in some theories of gravity other than Einstein's general relativity. However, these exceptions are often unstable solutions and/or do not lead to conserved quantum numbers so that "The 'spirit' of the no-hair conjecture, however, seems to be maintained". It has been proposed that "hairy" black holes may be considered to be bound states of hairless black holes and solitons.

In 2004, the exact analytical solution of a (3+1)-dimensional spherically symmetric black hole with minimally coupled self-interacting scalar field was derived. This showed that, apart from mass, electrical charge and angular momentum, black holes can carry a finite scalar charge which might be a result of interaction with cosmological scalar fields such as the inflaton. The solution is stable and does not possess any unphysical properties; however, the existence of a scalar field with the desired properties is only speculative.

== Observational results ==
The results from the first observation of gravitational waves in 2015 provide some experimental evidence consistent with the uniqueness of the no-hair theorem. This observation is consistent with Stephen Hawking's theoretical work on black holes in the 1970s.

Analysis of results from projects like the Event Horizon Telescope may allow testing no-hair theorem against astrophysical black holes.

== Soft hair ==
A study by Sasha Haco, Stephen Hawking, Malcolm Perry and Andrew Strominger postulates that black holes might contain "soft hair", giving the black hole more degrees of freedom than previously thought. This hair permeates at a very low-energy state, which is why it did not come up in previous calculations that postulated the no-hair theorem. This was the subject of Hawking's final paper which was published posthumously.

== See also ==
- Black hole information paradox
- Event Horizon Telescope
