= Sasha Haco =

English scientist and entrepreneur

- Born: 1992 or 1993 (age 33–34)
- Education: Cambridge University (PhD)
- Known for: Black hole entropy
- Awards: Women in Innovation (2021)
- Scientific career
- Fields: Applied mathematics; Theoretical physics
- Thesis: Large Gauge Transformations and Black Hole Entropy (2019)
- Doctoral advisor: Malcolm Perry

Sasha Haco (born 1992 or 1993) is an English theoretical physicist, entrepreneur and chief executive officer of Unitary, an online content moderation company.

== Education ==
Haco received her PhD in Theoretical Physics from the University of Cambridge in 2019. During her time at Cambridge, she worked with Stephen Hawking, Malcolm Perry and Andrew Strominger on the black hole information paradox. She spent a year as a visiting fellow at Cambridge from 2017 to 2018 and also spent a year at Harvard. In 2020, Haco was heavily featured in the Netflix documentary Black Holes: The Edge of All We Know, which chronicled the use of the Event Horizon Telescope to take the first photograph of a black hole, as well as the work of Haco, Hawking, Perry and Strominger as they attempted to better understand the black hole information paradox.

== Career ==
Haco founded Ditto Software in 2018 and most recently co-founded Unitary, where she currently serves as the chief executive officer. Unitary works to develop tools to identify and moderate abusive online content. In 2021, Haco was honoured with the Women in Innovation award recognizing her efforts addressing challenges in society.

== Publications ==
- Haco, Sasha; Hawking, Stephen; Perry, Malcolm; Strominger, Andrew (December 2018). "Black hole entropy and soft hair" (PDF). Journal of High Energy Physics. 2018 (12) 98. Springer Berlin Heidelberg: 1–19. arXiv:1810.01847. Bibcode:2018JHEP...12..098H. doi:10.1007/JHEP12(2018)098. S2CID 119494931.
- Haco, Sasha; Perry, Malcolm; Bourjaily, Jacob (February 2019). "Kerr-Newman black hole entropy and soft hair". arXiv:1902.02247 [hep-th].
- Haco, Sasha; Hawking, Stephen; Perry, Malcolm; Strominger, Andrew (October 2017). "The conformal BMS group". Journal of High Energy Physics. 2017 (11) 12. arXiv:1701.08110. Bibcode:2017JHEP...11..012H. doi:10.1007/JHEP11(2017)012. S2CID 4603773.
- Haco, Sasha (15 February 2020). Large Gauge Transformations and Black Hole Entropy (PDF) (PhD). University of Cambridge.
