= Nicole Yunger Halpern =

American theoretical physicist

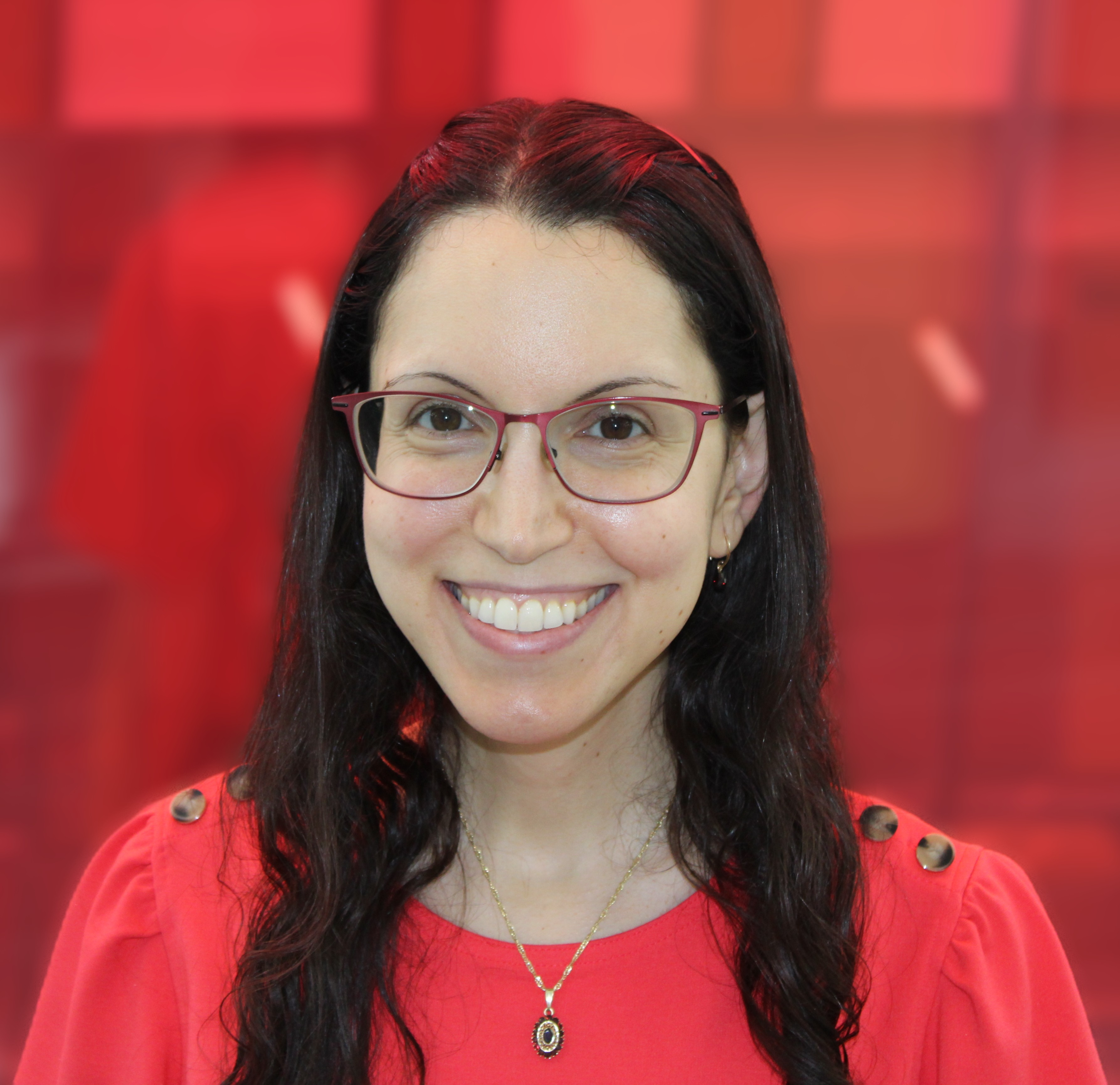
- Education: Dartmouth College, University of Waterloo, California Institute of Technology
- Known for: Quantum thermodynamics
- Scientific career
- Fields: Quantum thermodynamics
- Workplaces: National Institute of Standards and Technology University of Maryland, College Park Institute for Theoretical Atomic, Molecular and Optical Physics
- Thesis: Quantum Steampunk: Quantum Information, Thermodynamics, Their Intersection, and Applications Thereof Across Physics (2018)
- Doctoral advisor: John Preskill
- Website: https://quics.umd.edu/people/nicole-yunger-halpern

Nicole Yunger Halpern is an American author and theoretical physicist specializing in quantum thermodynamics. She works at the National Institute of Standards and Technology, is a fellow of the Joint Center for Quantum Information and Computer Science, and an adjunct professor at the University of Maryland, College Park.

== Education ==
Yunger Halpern received her bachelor's degree in physics from Dartmouth College in 2011 and a masters degree in physics at the University of Waterloo in 2013. She received a PhD in physics from the California Institute of Technology in 2018, where she studied under John Preskill. Her dissertation was titled "Quantum Steampunk: Quantum Information, Thermodynamics, Their Intersection, and Applications Thereof Across Physics". From 2018–2021 she was a postdoctoral fellow at the Institute for Theoretical Atomic, Molecular and Optical Physics at Harvard University.

== Quantum Steampunk ==
Yunger Halpern has discussed the relationship between her current quantum thermodynamics research and historical classical thermodynamics. A steampunk fan, she has used the genre to teach about quantum mechanics, using the term "quantum steampunk" to describe a combination of traditional steampunk with quantum technology. In 2022 she published her first book, "Quantum Steampunk", which uses steampunk elements to discuss quantum technology in a format accessible to those without a background in physics. Since its publication the book has received critical acclaim, and won the 2023 PROSE Award for Best Book in Popular Science and Popular Mathematics from the Association of American Publishers. She has also discussed and promoted quantum steampunk as an emerging subgenre of science fiction, organizing a quantum steampunk creative writing contest in 2023, and creating and teaching a quantum steampunk themed class at the University of Maryland in 2025. Yunger Halpern's research group is named "The Quantum-Steampunk Laboratory".

== Awards and accolades ==
- 2025 Early Career Scientist Award in Statistical Physics, awarded by the International Union of Pure and Applied Physics
- 2024 Hermann Weyl Prize, awarded by the International Colloquium on Group Theoretical Methods in Physics
- 2024 Katharine B. Gebbie Young Scientist Award
- 2023 PROSE Award for Best Book in Popular Science and Popular Mathematics, awarded by the Association of American Publishers
- 2023 Mary Somerville Medal
- 2020 International Quantum Technology Emerging Researcher Award, awarded by IOP Publishing
