= Membrane paradigm =

Approach to black hole quantum effects

In black hole theory, the membrane paradigm is a simplified model, useful for visualising and calculating the effects predicted by quantum mechanics for the exterior physics of black holes, without using quantum-mechanical principles or calculations. It models a black hole as a thin, classically radiating surface (or membrane) at or vanishingly close to the black hole's event horizon. This approach to the theory of black holes was created by Thibault Damour, Kip S. Thorne, R. H. Price and D. A. Macdonald.

== Electrical resistance ==
Thorne (1994) relates that this approach to studying black holes was prompted by the realisation by Hanni, Ruffini, Wald and Cohen in the early 1970s that since an electrically charged pellet dropped into a black hole should still appear to a distant outsider to be remaining just outside the event horizon, if its image persists, its electrical fieldlines ought to persist too, and ought to point to the location of the "frozen" image (1994, pp. 406). If the black hole rotates, and the image of the pellet is pulled around, the associated electrical fieldlines ought to be pulled around with it to create basic "electrical dynamo" effects (see: dynamo theory).

Further calculations yielded properties for a black hole such as apparent electrical resistance (pp. 408). Since these fieldline properties seemed to be exhibited down to the event horizon, and general relativity insisted that no dynamic exterior interactions could extend through the horizon, it was considered convenient to invent a surface at the horizon that these electrical properties could be said to belong to.

== Hawking radiation ==
After being introduced to model the theoretical electrical characteristics of the horizon, the membrane approach was then pressed into service to model the Hawking radiation effect predicted by quantum mechanics.

In the coordinate system of a distant stationary observer, Hawking radiation tends to be described as a quantum-mechanical particle-pair production effect (involving virtual particles), but for stationary observers hovering nearer to the hole, the effect is supposed to look like a purely conventional radiation effect involving real particles. In the membrane paradigm, the black hole is described as it should be seen by an array of these stationary, suspended noninertial observers, and since their shared coordinate system ends at the event horizon (because an observer cannot legally hover at or below the event horizon under general relativity), this conventional-looking radiation is described as being emitted by an arbitrarily thin shell of hot material at or just above the event horizon, where this coordinate system fails.

As in the electrical case, the membrane paradigm is useful because these effects should appear all the way down to the event horizon, but are not allowed by GR to be coming through the horizon – attributing them to a hypothetical thin radiating membrane at the horizon allows them to be modeled classically without explicitly contradicting general relativity's prediction that the event horizon is inescapable.

In 1986, Kip S. Thorne, Richard H. Price and D. A. Macdonald published an anthology of papers by various authors that examined this idea: "Black Holes: The membrane paradigm".

== See also ==
- Holographic principle
- Black hole complementarity
