= Graeme Smith (physicist) =

Canadian quantum information theorist

- Education: California Institute of Technology (M.S. 2004, Ph.D. 2006) University of Toronto (B.Sc. 2001)
- Known for: Quantum channel capacity superactivation
- Awards: Faculty of Mathematics Golden Jubilee Research Excellence Award (2024) Fellow of the American Physical Society (2023) NSF CAREER Award (2017)
- Scientific career
- Fields: Quantum information theory; Quantum computing; Physics
- Workplaces: University of Waterloo University of Colorado Boulder IBM Research
- Doctoral advisor: John Preskill

Graeme Smith is a Canadian physicist specializing in quantum information theory and quantum computing. He is an associate professor in the Department of Applied Mathematics at the University of Waterloo and a faculty member at the Institute for Quantum Computing (IQC) at Waterloo. Smith was previously a researcher at IBM's Thomas J. Watson Research Center and later a professor at the University of Colorado Boulder, where he was a Fellow of JILA and served as director of the Center for Theory of Quantum Matter. He is known for contributions to quantum communication theory, including the discovery of superactivation of quantum channel capacity (where two quantum channels each with zero capacity can together have a positive capacity). In 2023, he was elected a Fellow of the American Physical Society for his contributions to quantum information physics.

== Early life and education ==
Smith earned his Bachelor of Science in physics from the University of Toronto in 2001, and went on to receive a Master of Science in 2004 and a Ph.D. in 2006 in physics from the California Institute of Technology. His doctoral research at Caltech was supervised by theoretical physicist John Preskill.

== Career ==
After completing his Ph.D., Smith worked as a postdoctoral researcher in the Department of Computer Science at the University of Bristol from 2006 to 2007. He then joined the IBM T.J. Watson Research Center, where he was a postdoctoral fellow from 2007 to 2010 and subsequently a Research Staff Member from 2010 until 2016. In 2016, Smith was appointed as an assistant professor of physics at the University of Colorado Boulder. At Colorado, he became a Fellow of JILA (the joint institute of CU Boulder and NIST) and later served as the director of CU Boulder's Center for Theory of Quantum Matter. He was promoted to associate professor at Colorado and remained on the faculty there until 2023.

In July 2023, Smith joined the University of Waterloo as a faculty member of the Institute for Quantum Computing and an associate professor in the Department of Applied Mathematics. He also became an affiliate of the Perimeter Institute for Theoretical Physics and retains an adjoint affiliation with JILA.

== Research ==
Smith's research focuses on the theory of quantum information—extending classical information theory (Shannon theory) to quantum mechanical systems—and the fundamental limits of information storage, transmission, and processing in quantum systems. He has worked on problems in quantum error correction, quantum channel capacities, quantum communication in noisy environments, and the mathematical properties of entropy in quantum mechanics.

In 2008, Smith and fellow researcher Jon Yard discovered the phenomenon of superactivation of quantum channel capacity: they showed that there exist pairs of quantum communication channels, each with zero quantum capacity on its own, that can have a positive capacity when used together. This counterintuitive result, published in Science, was the first example of a quantum channel capacity superactivation and demonstrated that quantum information channels can exhibit non-additivity in their capacities.

Smith has also contributed to proving continuity bounds for quantum channel capacities and classified conditions under which certain entropic formulas remain additive in quantum information theory. He is an advocate for accurate science communication in quantum computing, often countering misconceptions about the field in public forums.

== Awards and honors ==
- Fellow of the American Physical Society (APS) – Elected in 2023 for "fundamental contributions on quantum channel capacities including proving continuity, elucidating the phenomenon of superactivation, and providing a classification of all the additive entropic formulas."
- NSF CAREER Award – Received in 2017 from the U.S. National Science Foundation for early-career research excellence (grant CCF-1652560).
- Outstanding Postdoctoral Mentor Award, University of Colorado Boulder – Awarded in 2021 for excellence in mentoring postdoctoral researchers.
- Faculty of Mathematics Golden Jubilee Research Excellence Award – University of Waterloo, 2024 (mid-career category), recognizing outstanding research contributions.
