= Samir D. Mathur =

Indian physicist

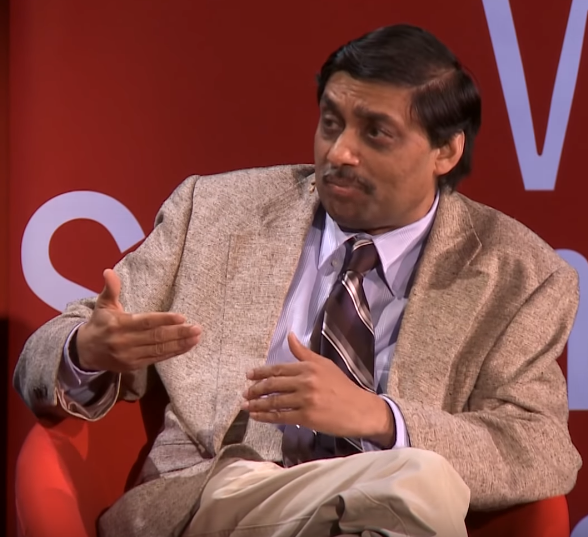
- Prof. Samir Mathur
- Born: Samir Dayal Mathur; Karur, Tamil Nadu, India
- Education: IIT Kanpur (M.S., 1981); TIFR (Ph.D., 1987)
- Known for: Fuzzball (string theory); Contributions to: String Theory; AdS/CFT; Black hole information paradox
- Scientific career
- Fields: Physics
- Workplaces: Ohio State University; MIT

Samir Dayal Mathur is a theoretical physicist who specializes in string theory and black hole physics.

== Career ==
=== Teaching ===
Mathur is a professor in the Department of Physics at Ohio State University and a member of the University's High Energy Theory Group. He was a faculty member at Massachusetts Institute of Technology from 1991–99 and held postdoctoral positions at Harvard University and the Tata Institute of Fundamental Research.

=== Research ===
Mathur's research is focused on string theory, black holes, the AdS/CFT correspondence, and cosmology. He is best known for developing the Fuzzball conjecture as a resolution of the black hole information paradox. The Fuzzball conjecture asserts that the fundamental description of black holes is given by a quantum bound state of matter which has the same size as the corresponding classical black hole. This quantum bound state replaces the event horizon and singularity, and the classical black hole metric is claimed to be an approximate effective description.

In 2009 Mathur published a strong version of the black hole information paradox, strengthening Stephen Hawking's original version by demonstrating that small local corrections to Hawking's semiclassical analysis cannot restore unitarity. This result was obtained by applying Strong Subadditivity of Quantum Entropy to the evaporation of Hawking radiation. This led to a renewed interest in the information paradox and the development of the 2012 black hole firewall paradox.
