= Thorne–Hawking–Preskill bet =

Bet on the outcome of the black hole information paradox

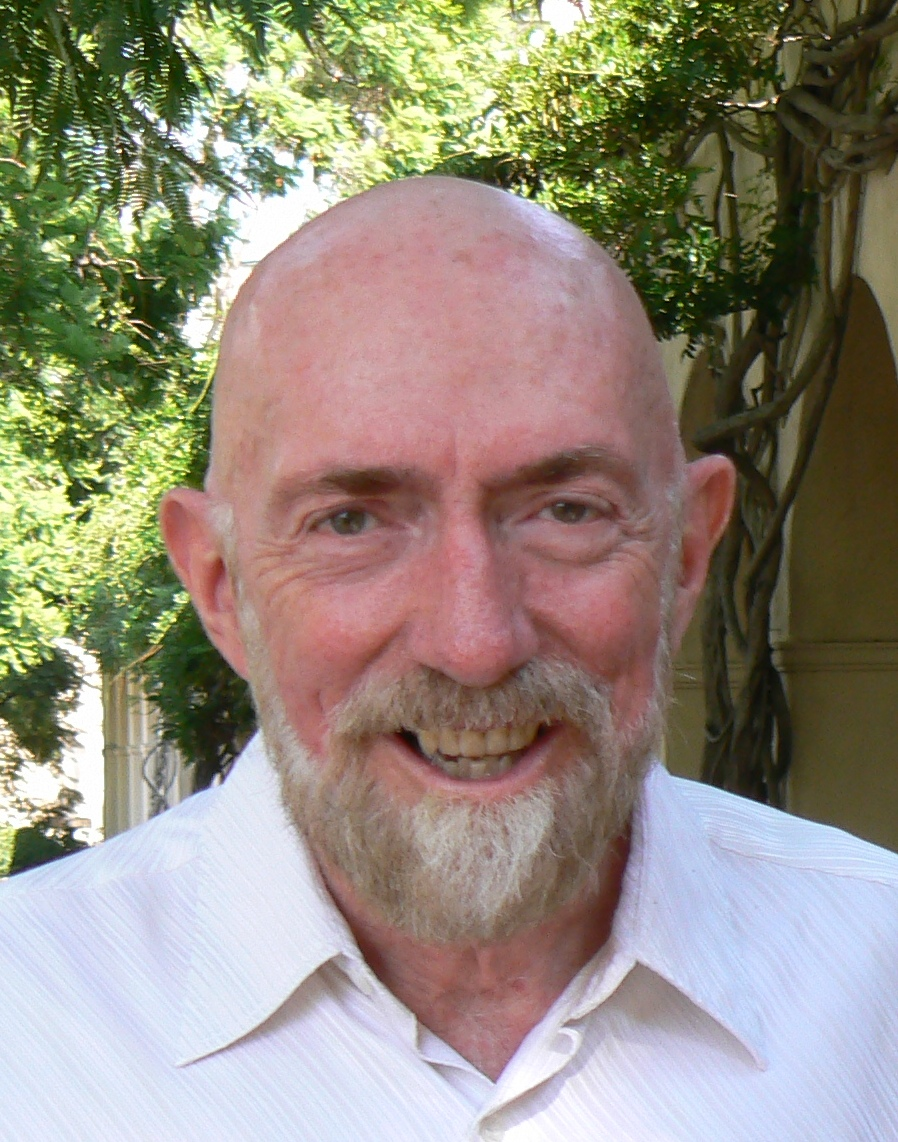
Kip Thorne

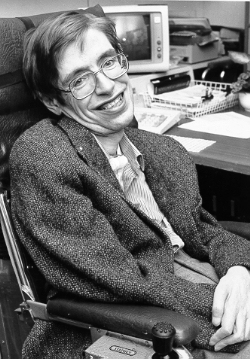
Stephen Hawking

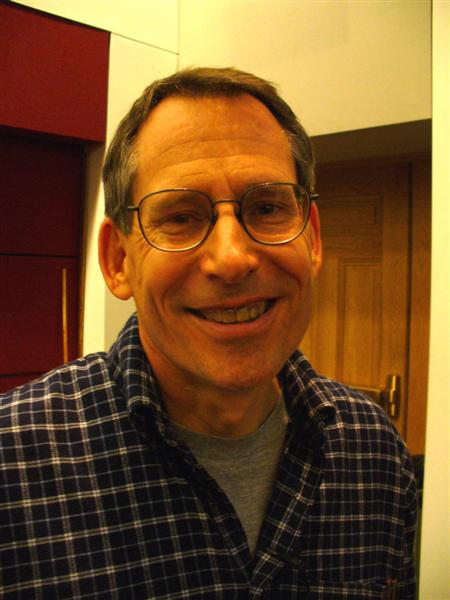
John Preskill

The Thorne–Hawking–Preskill bet was a public bet on the outcome of the black hole information paradox made in 1997 by physics theorists Kip Thorne and Stephen Hawking on the one side, and John Preskill on the other, according to the document they signed 6 February 1997, as shown in Hawking's 2001 book The Universe in a Nutshell.

== Overview ==
Thorne and Hawking argued that since general relativity made it impossible for black holes to radiate, and lose information, the mass-energy and information carried by Hawking radiation must be "new", and must not originate from inside the black hole event horizon. Since this contradicted the idea under quantum mechanics of microcausality, quantum mechanics would need to be rewritten. Preskill argued the opposite, that since quantum mechanics suggests that the information emitted by a black hole relates to information that fell in at an earlier time, the view of black holes given by general relativity must be modified in some way. The winning side of the bet would receive an encyclopedia of their choice, "from which information can be retrieved at will".

In 2004, Hawking announced that he was conceding the bet, and that he now believed that black hole horizons should fluctuate and leak information, in doing so providing Preskill with a copy of Total Baseball, The Ultimate Baseball Encyclopedia. Comparing the useless information obtainable from a black hole to "burning an encyclopedia", Hawking later joked, "I gave John an encyclopedia of baseball, but maybe I should just have given him the ashes." Thorne, however, remained unconvinced of Hawking's proof and declined to contribute to the award. As of 2024, Thorne has still not conceded. Hawking's argument that he solved the paradox has not yet been wholly accepted by the scientific community, and a consensus has not yet been reached that Hawking provided a strong enough argument that this is in fact what happens.

Hawking had earlier speculated that the singularity at the centre of a black hole could form a bridge to a "baby universe", into which the lost information could pass; such theories have been very popular in science fiction. But according to Hawking's new idea, presented at the 17th International Conference on General Relativity and Gravitation, on 21 July 2004 in Dublin, black holes eventually transmit, in a garbled form, information about all matter they swallow:

The Euclidean path integral over all topologically trivial metrics can be done by time slicing and so is unitary when analytically continued to the Lorentzian. On the other hand, the path integral over all topologically non-trivial metrics is asymptotically independent of the initial state. Thus the total path integral is unitary and information is not lost in the formation and evaporation of black holes. The way the information gets out seems to be that a true event horizon never forms, just an apparent horizon.

== Earlier Thorne–Hawking bet ==
An older bet from 1974 – about the existence of black holes – was described by Hawking as an "insurance policy" of sorts:

This was a form of insurance policy for me. I have done a lot of work on black holes, and it would all be wasted if it turned out that black holes do not exist. But in that case, I would have the consolation of winning my bet, which would win me four years of the magazine Private Eye. If black holes do exist, Kip will get one year of Penthouse. When we made the bet in 1975, we were 80% certain that Cygnus X-1 was a black hole. By now, I would say that we are about 95% certain, but the bet has yet to be settled.

— Stephen Hawking, A Brief History of Time (1988)

In the updated and expanded edition of A Brief History of Time, Hawking states, "Although the situation with Cygnus X-1 has not changed much since we made the bet in 1975, there is now so much other observational evidence in favour of black holes that I have conceded the bet. I paid the specified penalty, which was a one year subscription to Penthouse, to the outrage of Kip's liberated wife."

While Hawking described the bet as having been made in 1975, the written bet itself—in Thorne's handwriting, with his and Hawking's signatures—bears witness signatures under the legend "Witnessed this tenth day of December 1974". Thorne confirmed this date on the 10 January 2018 episode of Nova on PBS.

== See also ==
- Hawking radiation
- Scientific wager
