= Donald Marolf =

American theoretical physicist

Donald M. Marolf
- Education: University of Texas at Austin
- Known for: Black hole firewall paradox
- Scientific career
- Fields: Theoretical physics, general relativity, quantum gravity
- Institutions: University of California, Santa Barbara; Syracuse University
- Doctoral advisor: Bryce DeWitt

Donald Michael Marolf is an American theoretical physicist and professor of physics at the University of California, Santa Barbara.

== Biography ==
Marolf gained his Ph.D. from University of Texas at Austin in 1992, under Bryce DeWitt with a thesis on Green's Bracket Algebras and Their Quantization. His undergraduate degree is from William Jewell College in 1987.

After postdoctoral positions at Syracuse, Penn State, and UCSB, he joined the physics department at Syracuse as an assistant professor in 1996. In 2003, he moved to UCSB as an associate professor. He was chair of the physics department at the UCSB from 2016 to 2018.

Marolf is an expert on black hole thermodynamics, gravitational aspects in string theory, classical and quantum gravity. In the past he has worked on the canonical approach to quantum gravity, lower-dimensional models of quantum gravity, issues related to quantization of diffeomorphism-invariant theories, and a number of other topics. He is best known for originating the black hole firewall paradox.

== See also ==
- Firewall
