= Robert Myers (physicist) =

Canadian physicist

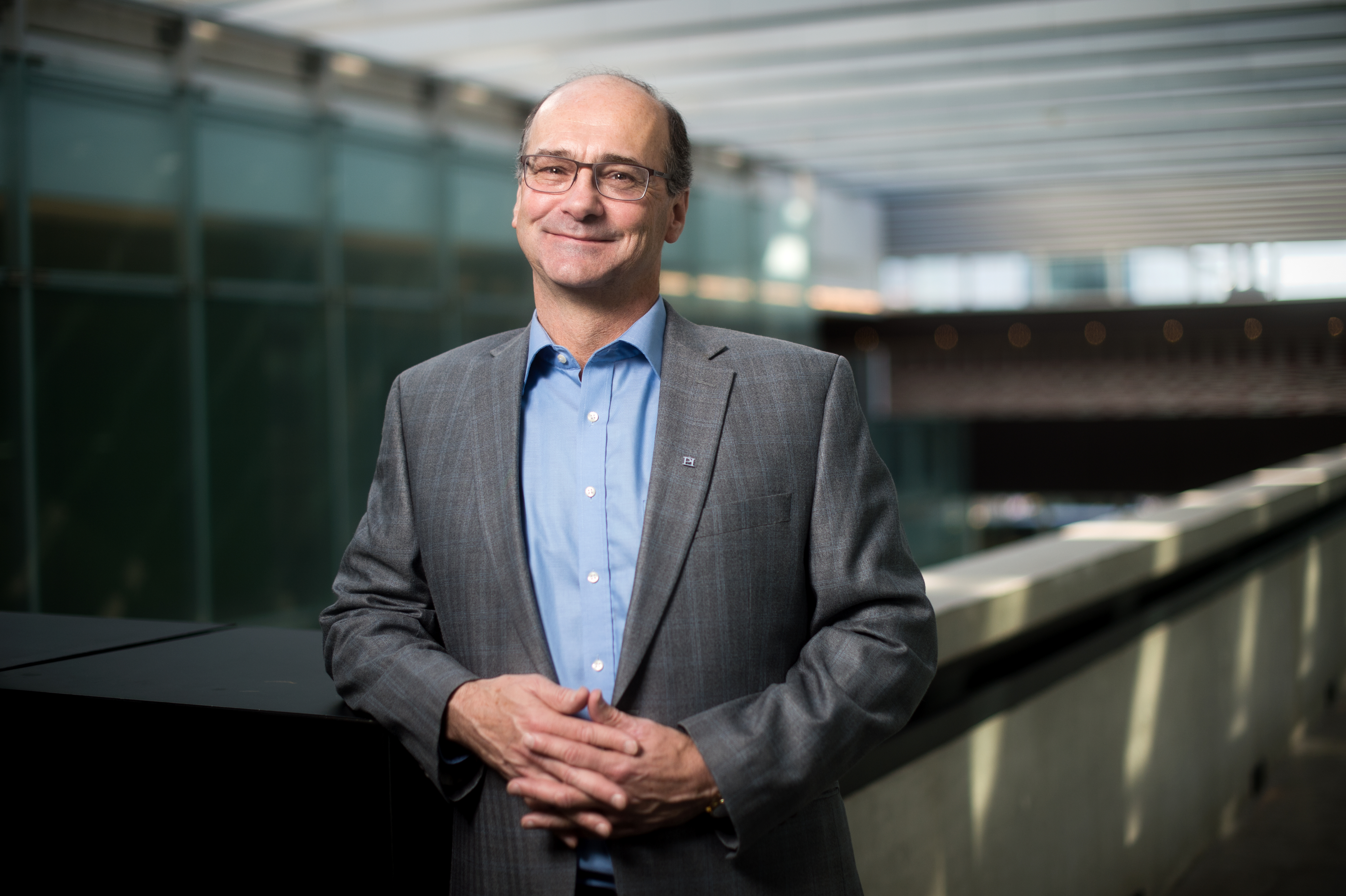
- Myers at Perimeter Institute
- Born: Robert C. Myers
- Education: University of Waterloo (undergrad); Princeton University (PhD)
- Known for: Myers–Perry metric
- Awards: Herzberg Medal (1999); CAP-CRM Prize (2005)
- Scientific career
- Fields: Theoretical physics
- Institutions: McGill University; Perimeter Institute

Robert C. Myers is a Canadian theoretical physicist who specializes in black holes, string theory and quantum entanglement. He served as the director of Perimeter Institute for Theoretical Physics between 2019 and 2024.

== Education ==
He did his undergraduate studies at University of Waterloo, gained his PhD at Princeton University, and was a postdoctoral researcher at University of California, Santa Barbara.

== Career ==
Following his post-doctoral research studies, from 1989 to 2001, Myers was a professor of physics at McGill University.

In 2019, Myers was appointed director of the Perimeter Institute for Theoretical Physics. where he holds the BMO Financial Group Isaac Newton Chair in Theoretical Physics. He served as Perimeter Institute's faculty chair from 2011 to 2018. He is also an adjunct professor of physics at the University of Waterloo.

=== Research ===
Myers' research concerns quantum fields and strings, and quantum gravity. His work focuses on foundational questions in quantum theory and gravity. His contributions span a broad range, from foundational quantum field theory to gravitational physics, black holes, and cosmology.

The Myers–Perry metric describes the higher-dimensional generalization of the Kerr metric.

== Research and awards ==
Myers has also won the Canadian Association of Physicists' (CAP) Herzberg Medal in 1999 and the 2005 CAP-CRM Prize in Theoretical and Mathematical Physics "for his outstanding contributions to theoretical physics, ranging from aspects in gravitational physics to foundational aspects of string theory."

In 2006, he was elected a Fellow of the Royal Society of Canada. He also won the CAP-TRIUMF Vogt Medal in 2012, and the Queen Elizabeth II Diamond Jubilee Medal. He was awarded University of Waterloo Distinguished Alumni Award in 2018.

== See also ==
- List of University of Waterloo people
