= Fuzzball (string theory) =

Quantum description of black holes

Fuzzballs are hypothetical objects in superstring theory, intended to provide a fully quantum description of the black holes predicted by general relativity.

The fuzzball hypothesis dispenses with the singularity at the heart of a black hole by positing that the entire region within the black hole's event horizon is actually an extended object: a ball of strings, which are advanced as the ultimate building blocks of matter and light. Under string theory, strings are bundles of energy vibrating in complex ways in both the three familiar dimensions of space as well as in extra dimensions. Fuzzballs provide resolutions to two major open problems in black hole physics. First, they avoid the gravitational singularity that exists within the event horizon of a black hole. General relativity predicts that at the singularity, the curvature of spacetime becomes infinite, and it cannot determine the fate of matter and energy that falls into it. Physicists generally believe that the singularity is not a real phenomenon, and proposed theories of quantum gravity, such as superstring theory, are expected to explain its true nature. Second, they resolve the black hole information paradox: the quantum information of matter falling into a black hole is trapped behind the event horizon, and seems to disappear from the universe entirely when the black hole evaporates due to Hawking radiation. This would violate a fundamental law of quantum mechanics requiring that quantum information be conserved.

As no direct experimental evidence supports either string theory in general or fuzzballs in particular, both are products purely of calculations and theoretical research. However, the existence of fuzzballs may be testable through gravitational-wave astronomy.

== Physical properties ==
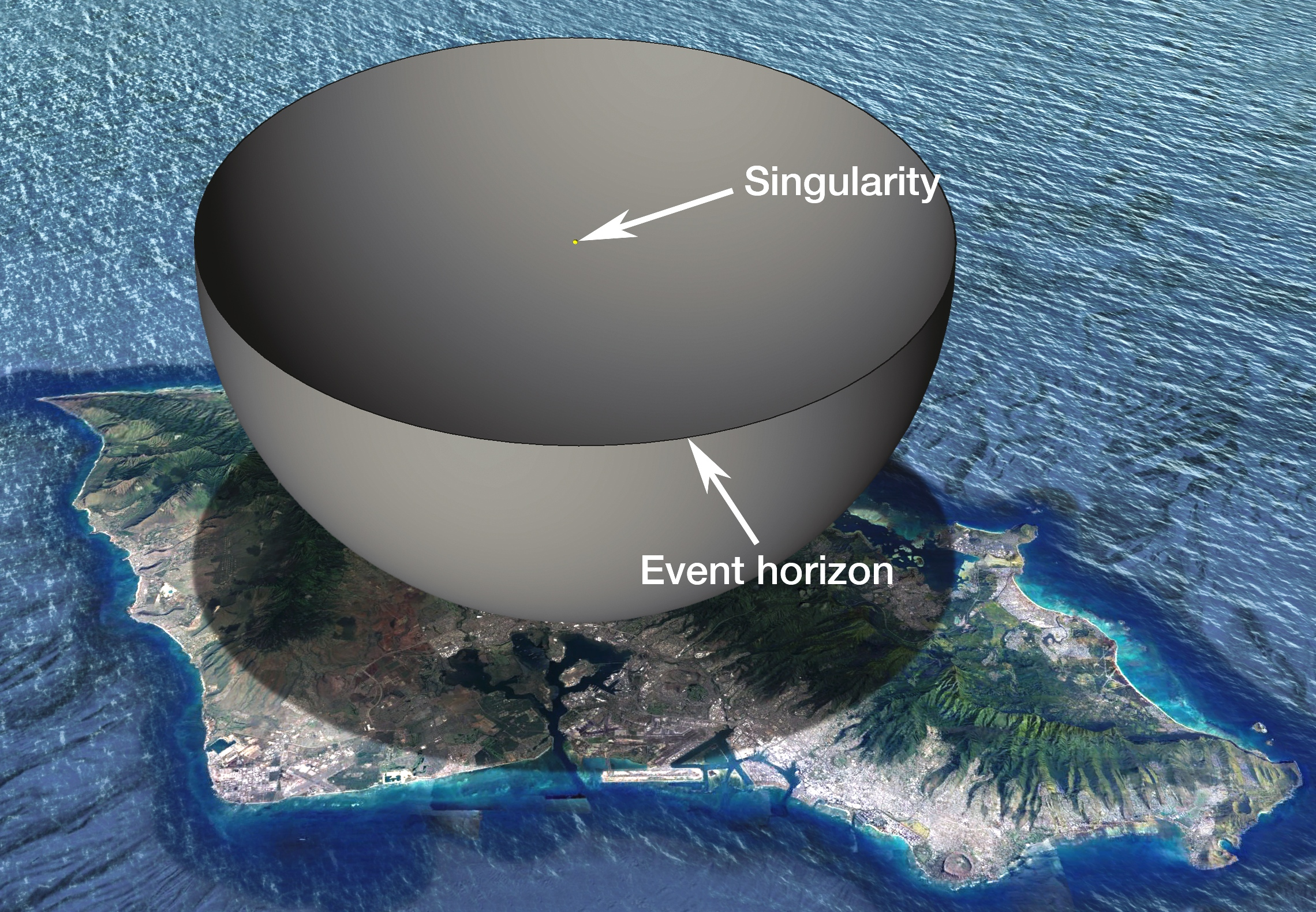
Shown over the Hawaiian island of Oahu is a cross-section of an unremarkable 6.8-solar-mass, 40-kilometer-diameter (25-mile) classic black hole (albeit non-spinning and perfectly spherical for simplicity). It comprises a singularity, an event horizon, and a void between them, which is cut off from spacetime. The fuzzball hypothesis posits that black holes are balls of the ultimate form of degenerate matter with a physical surface located precisely at the event horizon.

=== String theory and composition ===
Samir D. Mathur of Ohio State University published eight scientific papers between 2001 and 2012, assisted by postdoctoral researcher Oleg Lunin, who contributed to the first two papers. The papers propose that black holes are sphere-like extended objects with a definite volume and are composed of strings. This differs from the classic view of black holes in which there is a singularity at their centers, which are thought to be a zero-dimensional, zero-volume point in which the entire mass of a black hole is concentrated at infinite density, surrounded many kilometers away by an event horizon below which light cannot escape.

All variations of string theory hold that the fundamental constituents of subatomic particles, including the force carriers (e.g., photons and gluons), are actually strings of energy that take on their identities and respective masses by vibrating in different modes and frequencies. The fuzzball concept is rooted in a particular variant of superstring theory called Type IIB (see also String duality), which holds that strings are both "open" (double-ended entities) and "closed" (looped entities) and that there are 9 + 1 spacetime dimensions wherein five of the six extra spatial dimensions are "compactified".

Unlike the view of a black hole as a singularity, a small fuzzball can be thought of as an extra-dense neutron star in which the neutrons have undergone a phase transition and decomposed, liberating the quarks comprising them. Accordingly, fuzzballs are theorized to be the terminal phase of degenerate matter. Mathur calculated that the physical surfaces of fuzzballs have radii equal to that of the event horizon of classic black holes; thus, the Schwarzschild radius of a ubiquitous 6.8 solar mass (M_{☉}) stellar-mass-class black hole—or fuzzball—is 20 kilometers when the effects of spin are excluded. He also determined that the event horizon of a fuzzball would, at a very tiny scale (likely on the order of a few Planck lengths), be very much like a mist: fuzzy, hence the name "fuzzball".

With classical-model black holes, objects passing through the event horizon on their way to the singularity are thought to enter a realm of curved spacetime where the escape velocity exceeds the speed of light—a realm devoid of all structure. Moreover, precisely at the singularity—the heart of a classic black hole—spacetime itself is thought to break down catastrophically since infinite density demands infinite escape velocity; such conditions are problematic with known physics. Under the fuzzball premise, however, the strings comprising matter and photons are believed to fall onto and absorb into the fuzzball's surface, which is located at the event horizon—the threshold at which the escape velocity has achieved the speed of light.

A fuzzball is a black hole; spacetime, photons, and all else not exquisitely close to the surface of a fuzzball are thought to be affected in precisely the same fashion as with the classical model of black holes featuring a singularity at its center. The two theories diverge only at the quantum level; that is, classic black holes and fuzzballs differ only in their internal composition and how they affect virtual particles that form close to their event horizons (see § Information paradox, below). Fuzzballs are thought by their proponents to be the true quantum description of black holes.

=== Densities ===
Fuzzballs become less dense as their mass increases due to fractional tension. When matter or energy (strings) fall onto a fuzzball, more strings are not simply added to the fuzzball; strings fuse, or join. In doing so, all the quantum information of the in‑falling strings becomes part of larger, more complex strings. Due to fractional tension, string tension exponentially decreases as they become more complex with more vibration modes, relaxing to considerable lengths. The string theory formulas of Mathur and Lunin produce fuzzball surface radii that precisely equal Schwarzschild radii, which Karl Schwarzschild calculated using an entirely different mathematical technique 87 years earlier.

Since the volume of fuzzballs is a function of the Schwarzschild radius (2953 meters per M_{☉} for a non-rotating black hole), fuzzballs have a variable density that decreases as the inverse square of their mass (twice the mass is twice the diameter, which is eight times the volume, resulting in one-quarter the density). A typical 6.8 M_{☉} fuzzball would have a mean density of 4.0×10^{17} kg/m^{3}. This is an average, or mean, bulk density; as with neutron stars, the Sun, and its planets, a fuzzball's density varies from the surface where it is less dense, to its center where it is most dense. A bit of such a non-spinning fuzzball the size of a drop of water would, on average, have a mass of twenty million metric tons, which is equivalent to that of a granite ball 243 meters in diameter.

Though such densities are almost unimaginably extreme, they are, mathematically speaking, infinitely far from infinite density. Although the densities of typical stellar-mass fuzzballs are extreme—about the same as neutron stars—their densities are many orders of magnitude less than the Planck density (5.155×10^{96} kg/m^{3}), which is equivalent to the mass of the universe packed into the volume of a single atomic nucleus.

Since the mean densities of fuzzballs (and the effective densities of classic black holes) decrease as the inverse square of their mass, fuzzballs greater than 7 M_{☉} are actually less dense than neutron stars possessing the minimum possible density. Due to the mass-density inverse-square rule, fuzzballs need not even have unimaginable densities. Supermassive black holes, which are found at the center of virtually all galaxies, can have modest densities. For instance, Sagittarius A*, the black hole at the center of our Milky Way galaxy, is 4.3 million M_{☉}. The fuzzball model predicts that a non-spinning supermassive black hole with the same mass as Sagittarius A* has a mean density "only" 51 times that of gold. Moreover, at 3.9 billion M_{☉} (a rather large super-massive black hole), a non-spinning fuzzball would have a radius of 77 astronomical units—about the same size as the termination shock of the Solar System's heliosphere—and a mean density equal to that of the Earth's atmosphere at sea level (1.2 kg/m^{3}).

=== Neutron star collapse ===
Black holes (or fuzzballs) are produced in various ways, most of which are exceedingly violent mass-shedding events like supernovas, kilonovas, and hypernovas. However, an accreting neutron star (one slowly siphoning off mass from a companion star) that exceeds a critical mass limit, M_{max}, will suddenly and nonviolently (relatively speaking) collapse into a black hole or fuzzball. Such a collapse can serve as a helpful case study when examining the differences between the physical properties of neutron stars and fuzzballs.

Neutron stars have a maximum possible mass, known as the Tolman–Oppenheimer–Volkoff limit; this limit is not precisely known, but it is believed to lie between 2.2 M_{☉} and 2.9 M_{☉}. If a neutron star exceeds this mass, neutron degeneracy pressure can no longer resist the force of gravity and it will rapidly collapse until some new physical process takes over. In classical general relativity, the collapsing neutron star reaches a critical density and forms an event horizon; to the outside universe it becomes a black hole, and the collapse proceeds towards a gravitational singularity. In the fuzzball model, the hadrons in its core (neutrons and perhaps a smattering of protons and mesons) decompose into what could be regarded as the final stage of degenerate matter: a ball of strings, which the fuzzball model predicts is the true quantum description of not only black holes but theorized quark stars composed of quark matter.

== Information paradox ==
Classical black holes create a problem for physics known as the black hole information paradox; there is no such paradox under the fuzzball hypothesis. The paradox was first raised in 1972 by Jacob Bekenstein and later popularized by Stephen Hawking. The information paradox is born of a requirement of quantum mechanics that quantum information must be conserved, which conflicts with general relativity's requirement that if black holes have singularities at their centers, quantum information must be extinguished from spacetime. This paradox can be viewed as a contradiction between two very different theories: general relativity, which describes the largest gravity-based phenomena in the Universe, and quantum mechanics, which describes the smallest phenomena. Fuzzball theory purports to resolve this tension because the Type IIB superstring theory it is based on is a quantum description of gravity called supergravity.

A black hole that fed primarily on the stellar atmosphere (protons, neutrons, and electrons) of a nearby companion star should, if it obeyed the known laws of quantum mechanics, grow to have a quantum composition different from another black hole that fed only on light (photons) from neighboring stars and the cosmic microwave background. This follows a core precept of both classical and quantum physics that, in principle, the state of a system at one point in time should determine its state at any other time.

Yet, general relativity's implications for classic black holes are inescapable: Other than the fact that the two black holes would become increasingly massive due to the infalling matter and light, no difference in their quantum compositions would exist because if singularities have zero volume, black holes have no quantum composition. Moreover, even if quantum information was not extinguished at singularities, it could not climb against infinite gravitational intensity and reach up to and beyond the event horizon where it could reveal itself in normal spacetime. This is called the no-hair theorem, which states that black holes can reveal nothing about themselves to outside observers except their mass, angular momentum, and electric charge, whereby the latter two could theoretically be revealed through a phenomenon known as superradiance.

Stephen Hawking showed that quantum effects will make black holes appear to be blackbody radiators with effective temperatures inversely proportional to the mass of a black hole. This radiation, now called Hawking radiation, cannot circumvent the no-hair theorem as it can reveal only a black hole's mass. For all practical purposes, Hawking radiation is undetectable (see §Testability of the theory, below).

In a purely theoretical sense, the fuzzball theory advanced by Mathur and Lunin goes beyond Hawking's formula relating the blackbody temperature of Hawking radiation and the mass of the black hole emitting it. Fuzzball theory satisfies the requirement that quantum information be conserved because it holds, in part, that the quantum information of the strings that fall onto a fuzzball is preserved as those strings dissolve into and contribute to the fuzzball's quantum makeup. The theory further holds that a fuzzball's quantum information is not only expressed at its surface but tunnels up through the tunneling fuzziness of the event horizon where it can be imprinted on Hawking radiation, which very slowly carries that information into regular spacetime in the form of delicate correlations in the outgoing quanta.

Fuzzball theory's proposed solution to the black hole information paradox resolves a significant incompatibility between quantum mechanics and general relativity. At present, there is no widely accepted theory of quantum gravity—a quantum description of gravity—that is in harmony with general relativity. However, all five variations of superstring theory, including the Type IIB variant upon which fuzzball theory is based, have quantum gravity incorporated into them. Moreover, all five versions have been hypothesized as actually constituting five different limits, or subsets, that are unified under M-theory.

== Testability of the theory ==
As no direct experimental evidence supports either string theory or fuzzball theory, both are products purely of calculations and theoretical research. However, theories must be experimentally testable if there is to be a possibility of ascertaining their validity. To be in full accordance with the scientific method and one day be widely accepted as true—as are Einstein's theories of special and general relativity—theories regarding the natural world must make predictions that are consistently affirmed through observations of nature. Superstring theory predicts the existence of highly elusive particles that, while they are actively being searched for, have yet to be detected. Moreover, fuzzball theory cannot be substantiated by observing its predicted subtle effects on Hawking radiation because the radiation itself is for all practical purposes undetectable. However, fuzzball theory may be testable through gravitational-wave astronomy.

The first challenge insofar as the testability of fuzzball theory is it is rooted in unproven superstring theory, which is short for supersymmetric string theory. Supersymmetry predicts that for each known quanta (particle) in the Standard Model, a superpartner particle exists that differs by spin 1/2. This means that for every boson (massless particles in the Standard Model with integer spins like 0, 1, and 2), there is a supersymmetric-spin fermion-like particle known as a gaugino that has a half-odd-integer spin (e.g., 1/2 and 3/2) and possesses a rest mass. Examining this spin-1/2 supersymmetry in the opposite direction, superstring theory predicts that fermions from the Standard Model have boson-like superpartners known as sfermions, except that unlike actual gauge bosons from the Standard Model, sfermions don't strongly act as force carriers. All bosons (e.g., photons) and the boson-like sfermions will readily overlap each other when crowded, whereas fermions and the fermion-like gauginos possessing mass (such as electrons, protons, and quarks) will not; this is one reason why superpartners—if they exist—have properties that are exceedingly different from their Standard Model counterparts. Take the example of the photon, which is a massless boson with an integer spin of 1 and is the carrier of electromagnetism in the Standard Model; it is predicted to have a superpartner called a photino, which is a mass-carrying fermion with a half-odd-integer spin of 1/2. Conversely, the electron (spin 1/2) is an example of a mass-carrying fermion where its superpartner is the spin-0 selectron, which is a massless boson but is not considered to be a primary force carrier.

The experimental detection of superpartners would not only bolster superstring theory but would also help fill gaps in current particle physics, such as the likely composition of dark matter and the muon's anomalous magnetic moment (it should be precisely equal to 2 and is instead about 2.00233184, suggesting hidden interactions); particle physicists have accordingly been searching for these superpartners. Based on cosmological effects, there is strong evidence for the existence of dark matter of some sort (see Dark matter: Observational evidence), but if it is composed of subatomic particles, those particles have proven to be notoriously elusive despite the wide variety of detection techniques that have been employed since 1986. This difficulty in detecting supersymmetric particles is not surprising to particle physicists since the lightest ones are believed to be stable, electrically neutral, and interact weakly with the particles of the Standard Model. Though many searches using particle colliders have ruled out certain mass ranges for supersymmetric particles, the hunt continues.

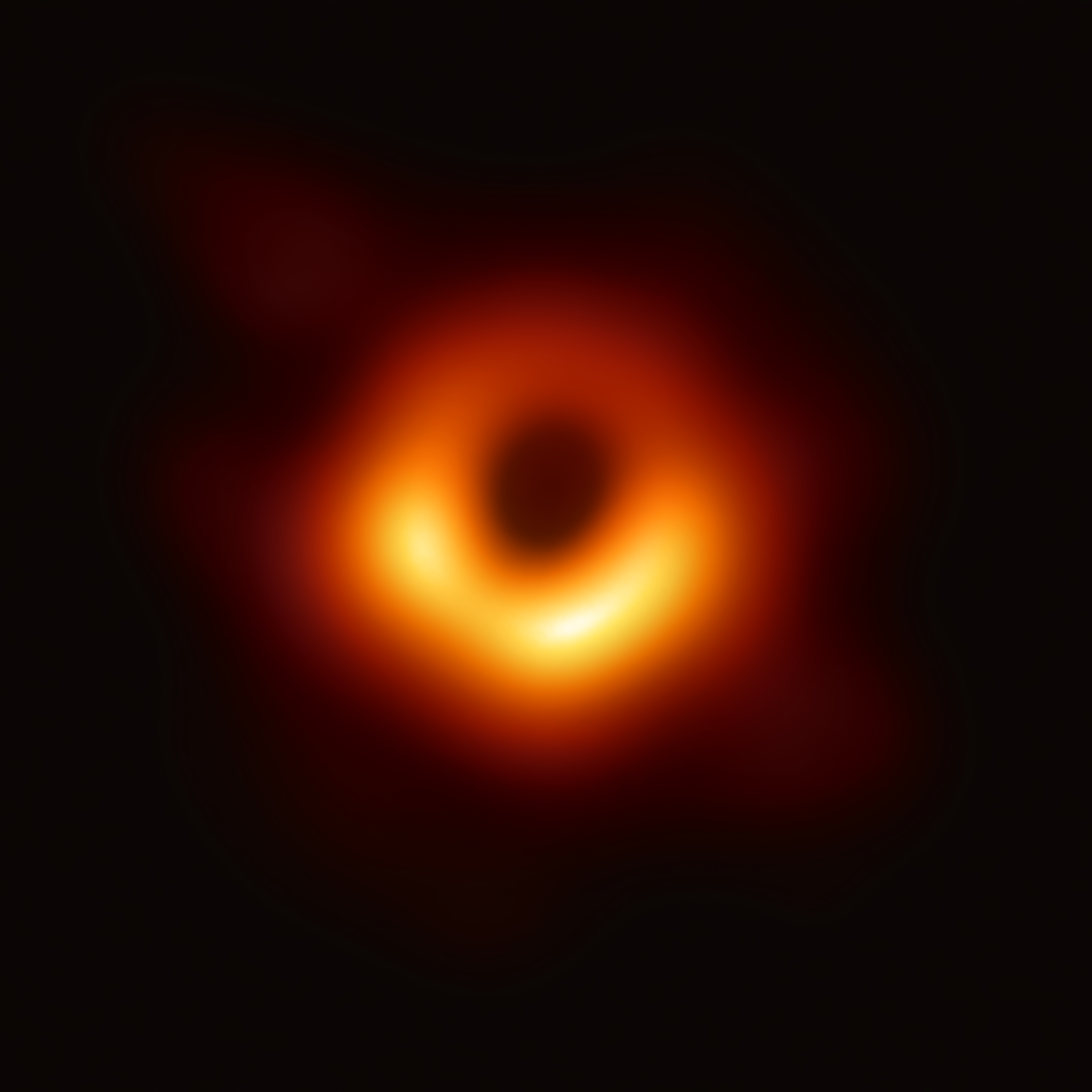
False-color view of the supermassive black hole M87* at the center of the galaxy Messier 87. This image was captured using 230 GHz (1.3 mm) microwaves. At around 6.5×10^{9} M_{☉}, M87* emits invisible Hawking radiation with a peak-emission wavelength 43 times larger than the orbital diameter of Neptune.

Fuzzball theory resolves a long-standing conflict between general relativity and quantum mechanics by holding that quantum information is preserved in fuzzballs and that Hawking radiation originating within the Planck-scale quantum foam just above a fuzzball's surface is subtly encoded with that information. As a practical matter, however, Hawking radiation is virtually impossible to detect because black holes emit it at astronomically low power levels and the individual photons constituting Hawking radiation have extraordinarily little energy. This underlies why theoretically perfectly quiescent black holes (ones in a universe containing no matter or other types of electromagnetic radiation to absorb) evaporate so slowly as they lose energy (and equivalent amounts of mass) via Hawking radiation; even a modest 4.9 M_{☉} black hole would require 10^{59} times the current age of the Universe to vanish. Moreover, a top-of-the-list 106 billion M_{☉} supermassive black hole would require ten million-trillion-trillion times longer still to evaporate: 10^{90} times the age of the Universe.

Hawking showed that the energy of photons released by Hawking radiation is inversely proportional to the mass of a black hole and, consequently, the smallest black holes emit the most energetic photons that are the least difficult to detect. However, the radiation emitted by even a minimum-size, 2.7 M_{☉} black hole (or fuzzball) comprises extremely low-energy photons that are equivalent to those emitted by a black body with a temperature of around 23 billionths of one kelvin above absolute zero. More challenging still, such a black hole has a radiated power—for the entire black hole—of 1.2×10^{−29} watt (12 billion-billion-billionths of one milliwatt). Such an infinitesimal transmitted power is to one watt as 1/3000th of a drop of water (about one-quarter the volume of a typical grain of table salt) is to all the Earth's oceans.

Critically though, when signals are this weak, the challenge is no longer one of classic radio astronomy technological issues like gain and signal-to-noise ratio; Hawking radiation comprises individual photon quanta, so such a weak signal means a 2.7 M_{☉} black hole is emitting at most only ten photons per second. Even if such a black hole was only 100 lightyears away, the odds of just one of its Hawking radiation photons landing anywhere on Earth—let alone being captured by an antenna—while a human is watching are astronomically improbable. Importantly, the above values are for the smallest possible stellar-mass black holes; far more difficult yet to detect is the Hawking radiation emitted by supermassive black holes at the center of galaxies. For instance, M87* which is an unremarkable supermassive black hole, emits Hawking radiation at a near-nonexistent radiant power of at most 13 photons per century and does so with a wavelength so great that a receiving antenna possessing even a modest degree of absorption efficiency would be larger than the Solar System.

However, fuzzball theory may be testable through gravitational-wave astronomy. Gravitational wave observatories like the Laser Interferometer Gravitational-Wave Observatory (LIGO) have proven to be a revolutionary advancement in astronomy and are enabling astronomers and theoretical physicists to develop ever-more detailed insights into compact objects such as neutron stars and black holes. Ever since the first direct detection of gravitational waves, a 2015 event known as GW150914, which was a merger between a binary pair of stellar-mass black holes, gravitational-wave signals have so far matched the predictions of general relativity for classical black holes with singularities at their centers. However, an Italian team of scientists that ran computer simulations suggested in 2021 that existing gravitational-wave observatories are capable of discerning fuzzball-theory-supporting evidence in the signals from merging binary black holes (and the resultant effects on ringdowns) by virtue of the nontrivial unique attributes of fuzzballs, which are extended objects with a physical structure. The team's simulations predicted slower-than-expected decay rates for certain vibration modes that would also be dominated by "echoes" from earlier ring oscillations. Moreover, a separate Italian team a year earlier posited that future gravitational-wave detectors, such as the proposed Laser Interferometer Space Antenna (LISA), which is intended to have the ability to observe high-mass binary mergers at frequencies far below the limits of current observatories, would improve the ability to confirm aspects of fuzzball theory by orders of magnitude.
