= Higher-dimensional Einstein gravity =

Theories of higher-dimensional general relativity

Higher-dimensional Einstein gravity is any of various physical theories that attempt to generalize to higher dimensions various results of the standard (four-dimensional) Albert Einstein's gravitational theory, that is, general relativity. This attempt at generalization has been strongly influenced in recent decades by string theory. These extensions of general relativity are central to many modern theories of fundamental physics, including string theory, M-theory, and brane world scenarios. These models are used to explore theoretical aspects of gravity and spacetime in contexts beyond four-dimensional physics, and provide novel solutions to Einstein's equations, such as higher-dimensional black holes and black rings.

At present, these theories remain largely theoretical and lack direct observational or experimental support. Currently, it has no direct observational and experimental support, in contrast to four-dimensional general relativity. However, this theoretical work has led to the possibility of proving the existence of extra dimensions. This is demonstrated by the proof of Harvey Reall and Roberto Emparan that there is a 'black ring' solution in 5 dimensions. If such a 'black ring' could be produced in a particle accelerator such as the Large Hadron Collider, this could potentially provide evidence supporting the existence of extra dimensions.

== Historical background ==
The first attempts to introduce extra dimensions date back to the 1920s with the work of Theodor Kaluza and Oskar Klein, who developed a five-dimensional theory to unify gravity and electromagnetism, now known as Kaluza–Klein theory. This approach introduced the idea that extra dimensions could be compactified, or curled up to unobservable sizes.

Interest in higher-dimensional theories re-emerged in the 1970s and 1980s with the development of supergravity and string theory. Superstring theory requires ten spacetime dimensions for mathematical consistency, while M-theory, a proposed unification of all string theories, is formulated in eleven dimensions.

== Theoretical framework ==
In higher-dimensional gravity, the Einstein field equations are extended to account for additional spacetime dimensions. These generalizations allow for the analysis of more varied geometric structures and physical scenarios. While the core ideas remain rooted in the curvature of spacetime and its relation to matter and energy, higher dimensions allow for a broader variety of solutions and physical implications.

Theoretical models in higher-dimensional gravity often incorporate compactified or warped extra dimensions, and can include corrections to the classical Einstein–Hilbert action. A notable extension is Lovelock gravity, which modifies the action by introducing higher-order curvature terms while still yielding second-order field equations. These modifications are introduced because in dimensions greater than four, the Einstein–Hilbert action is not the most general theory that leads to second-order equations of motion, which are important for physical consistency and stability.

One especially significant case is Gauss–Bonnet gravity, which includes quadratic curvature corrections and becomes dynamically non-trivial in dimensions five and higher. These theories are studied in the context of problems in high-energy physics, such as the nature of singularities, the behavior of black holes in higher dimensions, and the unification of gravity with quantum field theory.

== Exact solutions ==
The higher-dimensional generalization of the Kerr metric was discovered by Robert Myers and Malcolm Perry. Like the Kerr metric, the Myers–Perry metric has spherical horizon topology. The construction involves making a Kerr–Schild ansatz; by a similar method, the solution has been generalized to include a cosmological constant. The black ring is a solution of five-dimensional general relativity. It inherits its name from the fact that its event horizon is topologically S^{1} × S^{2}. This is unlike other known black hole solutions in five dimensions, which typically have horizon topology S^{3}.

In 2014, Hari Kunduri and James Lucietti proved the existence of a black hole with Lens space topology of the L(2, 1) type in five dimensions, this was next extended to all L(p, 1) with positive integers p by Shinya Tomizawa and Masato Nozawa in 2016 and finally in a preprint to all L(p, q) and any dimension by Marcus Khuri and Jordan Rainone in 2022, a black lens doesn't necessarily need to rotate as a black ring, although known examples require a matter field sourced from the extra dimensions for stability.

== Black hole uniqueness ==
In four dimensions, Hawking proved that the topology of the event horizon of a non-rotating black hole must be spherical. Because the proof uses the Gauss–Bonnet theorem, it does not generalize to higher dimensions. The discovery of black ring solutions in five dimensions shows that other topologies are allowed in higher dimensions, but it is unclear precisely which topologies are allowed. It has been shown that the horizon must be of positive Yamabe type, meaning that it must admit a metric of positive scalar curvature.

== Applications in string theory and quantum gravity ==
Higher-dimensional gravity appears in string theory and M-theory as a central element for mathematical consistency, where extra dimensions are essential for mathematical consistency. In these frameworks, gravity is inherently higher-dimensional, while standard model forces are often confined to lower-dimensional hypersurfaces known as branes.

Compactification mechanisms, such as Calabi–Yau manifolds in string theory, reduce the apparent number of dimensions to four at observable scales. The geometry and topology of the compactified dimensions may influence the properties of particles and interactions in the effective four-dimensional theory.

Higher-dimensional solutions are also important in the context of the AdS/CFT correspondence, a conjectured duality between gravity in anti-de Sitter space and a conformal field theory on its boundary. In this context, black hole solutions in higher dimensions correspond to thermal states in the dual quantum field theory and have been applied to study strongly coupled systems in condensed matter and nuclear physics.

== See also ==
- Gauss–Bonnet gravity
- General relativity
- Kaluza–Klein theory
- Graviton
