= John Preskill =

American theoretical physicist

- Preskill in 2026
- Born: January 19, 1953 (age 73); Highland Park, Illinois
- Citizenship: United States
- Education: Princeton University (B.A.), Harvard University (Ph.D.)
- Known for: Thorne–Hawking–Preskill bet, Hayden–Preskill thought experiment, Continuous-variable quantum information, NISQ era Gottesman–Kitaev–Preskill code
- Spouse: Roberta Preskill (2 children)
- Scientific career
- Fields: Theoretical Physics
- Workplaces: California Institute of Technology
- Thesis: Unified gauge theories without elementary scalar fields (1980)
- Doctoral advisor: Steven Weinberg
- Doctoral students: Peter Galison; Daniel Gottesman; Anton Kapustin; Sandip Trivedi; Graeme Smith (physicist); Nicole Yunger Halpern

John Phillip Preskill (born January 19, 1953) is an American theoretical physicist and the Richard P. Feynman Professor of Theoretical Physics at the California Institute of Technology, where he is also the director of the Institute for Quantum Information and Matter.

Preskill is an active scientist in the field of quantum information science and quantum computation, and he is known for coining the term "quantum supremacy" and that of "noisy intermediate-scale quantum (NISQ)" devices.

== Biography ==
Preskill was born on January 19, 1953, in Highland Park, Illinois. He attended Highland Park High School, from where he graduated as class valedictorian in 1971. Preskill graduated summa cum laude from Princeton University with an A.B. in physics in 1975, completing his senior thesis, titled "Broken symmetry of the Pseudoscalar Yukawa theory", under the supervision of Arthur S. Wightman. Preskill received his Ph.D. in the same subject from Harvard University in 1980. His graduate adviser at Harvard was Steven Weinberg.

While still a graduate student, Preskill made a name for himself by publishing a paper on the cosmological production of superheavy magnetic monopoles in Grand Unified Theories. Since we do not observe any magnetic monopoles, this work pointed out serious flaws in the then current cosmological models, a problem which was later addressed by Alan Guth and others by proposing the idea of cosmic inflation.

After three years as a junior fellow of the Harvard Society of Fellows, Preskill became associate professor of theoretical physics at Caltech in 1983, rising to full professorship in 1990. Since 2000 he has been the director of the Institute for Quantum Information at Caltech. In recent years most of his work has been in mathematical issues related to quantum computation and quantum information theory. He is known for coining the term "Quantum Supremacy" in a 2012 paper.

Preskill has achieved some notoriety in the popular press as party to a number of bets involving fellow theoretical physicists Stephen Hawking and Kip Thorne. Hawking conceded the Thorne–Hawking–Preskill bet in 2004 and gave Preskill a copy of Total Baseball, The Ultimate Baseball Encyclopedia.

Preskill was elected as a Fellow of the American Physical Society in 1991 and a member of the National Academy of Sciences in 2014.

== See also ==
- Topological entanglement entropy
- Gottesman–Kitaev–Preskill codes
