= Malcolm Perry (physicist) =

British physicist

Malcolm John Perry
- Born: 13 November 1951 (age 74); Birmingham, England
- Education: St John's College, Oxford; King's College, Cambridge
- Known for: Contributions to higher-dimensional gravity, quantum gravity, string theory, supergravity
- Scientific career
- Fields: Theoretical physics
- Workplaces: DAMTP, University of Cambridge; Trinity College, Cambridge; Centre for Research in String Theory, Queen Mary University of London
- Doctoral advisor: Stephen Hawking
- Doctoral students: Robert Myers; Stephen Fletcher Hewson

Malcolm John Perry (born 13 November 1951) is a British theoretical physicist and emeritus professor of theoretical physics at University of Cambridge and professor of theoretical physics at Queen Mary University of London. His research mainly concerns quantum gravity, black holes, general relativity, and supergravity.

== Biography ==
Perry attended King Edward's School, Birmingham, before reading physics at St John's College, Oxford. He was a graduate student at King's College, Cambridge, under the supervision of Stephen Hawking. He obtained his doctorate in 1978 with a thesis on the quantum mechanics of black holes. In these early years, he worked on several very influential papers on Euclidean quantum gravity and black hole radiation with Gary Gibbons and Hawking.

After his graduate studies, he worked in Princeton, New Jersey, from 1978 to 1986. With his student Rob Myers, he found the Myers–Perry metric, which describes the higher-dimensional generalization of the Kerr metric. He also started working on supergravity, string theory and Kaluza–Klein theory. In his final years in Princeton he worked with Curtis Callan, Emil Martinec and Daniel Friedan to calculate the low-energy effective action for string theory.

In 1986, he returned to Cambridge, being elected a fellow of Trinity College, Cambridge, where he has worked ever since. In 2010, his attention has focused on generalised geometry and the doubled formalism for string theory, extending these ideas to M-theory in collaboration with David Berman. In 2016, he returned to black hole physics with Hawking and Andrew Strominger and began a series of highly influential works attempting to solve long standing problems in black hole thermodynamics.
