= Center vortex =

Type of topological defects in the Yang–Mills vacuum

Center vortices are line-like topological defects that exist in the vacuum of Yang–Mills theory and QCD. There is evidence in lattice simulations that they play an important role in the confinement of quarks.

== Topological description ==
Center vortices carry a gauge charge under the center elements of the universal cover of the gauge group G. Equivalently, their topological charge is an element of the fundamental group of this universal cover quotiented by its center.

On a 2-dimensional space M a center vortex at a point x may be constructed as follows. Begin with a trivial G bundle over M. Cut along a circle linking x. Glue the total space back together with a transition function which is a map from the cut circle to a representation of G. The new total space is the gauge bundle of a center vortex.

Now the vortex at x is constructed. Its topological charge can be computed as follows. Lifting this map up to the universal cover of G, each time one circumnavigates the circle, the transition function shifts by some element in the center of the universal cover. This element is the charge.

Center vortices also exist on higher dimensional spaces. They are always codimension two, and the above construction is generalized by cutting along a tube surrounding the vortex.

== In SU(N) theories ==
In the case of SU(N) gauge theories, the center consists of the constant matrices:

$$z_n = e^{\frac{2\pi in}N} I\;,$$

where I is the unit matrix. These elements form the abelian subgroup Z_{N}. Under such center elements, quarks transform as

$$\psi \to e^{\frac{2\pi in}N}\psi\;,$$

while gluons are invariant. This means that, if quarks are free (like in the deconfined phase), the center symmetry will be broken. Restoration of the center symmetry will imply confinement. 't Hooft first put this on a more rigorous footing.

The two phases in the theory can be distinguished based on the behavior of the vortices. When considering a certain Wilson loop, if the vortices are generally long, most vortices will only pierce the surface within the Wilson loop once. Furthermore, the number of vortices piercing this surface will grow in proportion to the area of the surface. Due to the vortices suppressing the value of the vacuum expectation value of the Wilson loop, this will lead to an area-law, i.e. the Wilson loop W(C) behaves like

$$\langle W(C)\rangle \propto e^{-\sigma A}\;,$$

where A is the area spanned by the loop. The constant σ is called the string tension. This behavior is typical of confinement. However, when considering a regime where vortices are generally short — i.e. they form small loops — they will usually pierce the surface of the Wislon loop twice in opposite directions, thus leading to the two contributions canceling. Only vortex loops near the Wilson loop itself will pierce it once, thus leading to a contribution scaling like the perimeter:

$$\langle W(C)\rangle \propto e^{-\alpha L}\;,$$

with L the length of the Wilson loop, and α some constant. This behavior signals there is no confinement.

In lattice simulations this behavior is indeed seen. At low temperatures (where there is confinement) vortices form large, complex clusters and percolate through space. At higher temperatures (above the deconfinement phase transition) vortices form small loops. Furthermore, it has been seen that the string tension almost drops to zero when center vortices are removed from the simulation. At the other hand, the string tension remains approximately unchanged when removing everything except for the center vortices. This clearly shows the close relation between center vortices and confinement. Aside from this it has also been shown in simulations that the vortices have a finite density in the continuum limit (meaning they are not a lattice artifact, but they do exist in reality), and that they are also linked with chiral symmetry breaking and topological charge.

One subtlety concerns the string tension at intermediate range and in the large-N limit. According to the center vortex picture, the string tension should depend on the way the matter fields transform under the center, i.e. their so-called N-ality. This seems to be correct for the large-distance string tension, but at smaller distances the string tension is instead proportional to the quadratic Casimir of the representation — so-called Casimir scaling. This has been explained by domain formation around center vortices. In the large-N limit, this Casimir scaling goes all the way to large distances.

== In gauge theories with trivial center ==
Consider the gauge group SO(3). It has a trivial center but its fundamental group π_{1}(SO(3)) is Z_{2}. Similarly its universal cover is SU(2) whose center is again Z_{2}. Thus center vortices in this theory are charged under Z_{2} and so one expects that pairs of vortices can annihilate.

Also G_{2} gauge theory does not have a long-range string tension, which is consistent with the center vortex picture. In this theory, gluons can screen quarks, leading to color singlet states with the quantum number of quarks. Casimir scaling is, however, still present at intermediate ranges, i.e. before string breaking occurs. This can be explained by domain formation.

== See also ==
- QCD vacuum
- 't Hooft loop
