= Elitzur's theorem =

Gauge symmetry cannot be spontaneously broken

In quantum field theory and statistical field theory, Elitzur's theorem states that in gauge theories, the only operators that can have non-vanishing expectation values are ones that are invariant under local gauge transformations. An important implication is that gauge symmetry cannot be spontaneously broken. The theorem was first proved in 1975 by Shmuel Elitzur in lattice field theory, although the same result is expected to hold in the continuum limit. The theorem shows that the naive interpretation of the Higgs mechanism as the spontaneous symmetry breaking of a gauge symmetry is incorrect, although the phenomenon can be reformulated entirely in terms of gauge invariant quantities in what is known as the Fröhlich–Morchio–Strocchi mechanism.

== Theory ==
A field theory admits different types of symmetries, with the two most common ones being global and local symmetries. Global symmetries are fields transformations acting the same way everywhere while local symmetries act on fields in a position dependent way. The latter correspond to redundancies in the description of the system. This is a consequence of Noether's second theorem which states that each local symmetry degree of freedom corresponds to a relation among the Euler–Lagrange equations, making the system underdetermined. Underdeterminacy requires gauge fixing of the non-propagating degrees of freedom so that the equations of motion admit a unique solution.

Spontaneous symmetry breaking occurs when the action of a theory has a symmetry but the vacuum state violates this symmetry. In that case there will exist a local operator that is non-invariant under the symmetry giving it a nonzero vacuum expectation value. Such non-invariant local operators always have vanishing vacuum expectation values for finite size systems, prohibiting spontaneous symmetry breaking. This occurs because over large timescales, finite systems always transition between all possible ground states, averaging away the expectation value of the operator.

While spontaneous symmetry breaking can occur for global symmetries, Elitzur's theorem states that the same is not the case for gauge symmetries; all vacuum expectation values of gauge non-invariant operators are vanishing, even in systems of infinite size. On the lattice this follows from the fact that integrating gauge non-invariant observables over a group measure always yields zero for compact gauge groups. Positivity of the measure and gauge invariance are sufficient to prove the theorem. This is also an explanation for why gauge symmetries are mere redundancies in lattice field theories, where the equations of motion need not define a well-posed problem as they do not need to be solved. Instead, Elitzur's theorem shows that any observable that is not invariant under the symmetry has a vanishing expectation value, making it unobservable and therefore redundant.

Showing that a system admits spontaneous symmetry breaking requires introducing a weak external source field that breaks the symmetry and gives rise to a preferred ground state. The system is then taken to the thermodynamic limit after which the external source field is switched off. If the vacuum expectation value of symmetry non-invariant operators is nonzero in this limit then there is spontaneous symmetry breaking. Physically it means that the system never leaves the original ground state into which it was placed by the external field. For global symmetries this occurs because the energy barrier between the various ground states is proportional to the volume, so in the thermodynamic limit this diverges, locking the system into the ground state. Local symmetries get around this construction because the energy barrier between two ground states depends only on local features so transitions to different gauge related ground states can occur locally and does not require the field to change everywhere at the same time as it does for global symmetries.

== Limitations and implications ==
There are a number of limitations to the theorem. In particular, spontaneous symmetry breaking of a gauge symmetry is allowed in a system with infinite spatial dimensions or a symmetry with an infinite number of variables, since in these cases there are infinite energy barriers between gauge related configurations. The theorem also does not apply to residual gauge degrees of freedom nor large gauge transformations, which can in principle be spontaneously broken. Furthermore, all current proofs rely on a lattice field theory formulation so they may be invalid in a genuine continuum field theory. It is therefore in principle plausible that there may exist exotic continuum theories for which gauge symmetries can be spontaneously broken, although such a scenario remains unlikely due to the absence of any known examples.

Landau's classification of phases uses expectation values of local operators to determine the phase of the system. However, Elitzur's theorem shows that this approach is inadmissible in certain systems such as Yang–Mills theories for which no local operator can act as an order operator for confinement. Instead, to get around the theorem requires constructing nonlocal gauge invariant operators, whose expectation values need not be zero. The most common ones are Wilson loops and their thermal equivalents, Polyakov loops. Another nonlocal operator that acts as a order operator is the 't Hooft loop.

Since gauge symmetries cannot be spontaneously broken, this calls into question the validity of the Higgs mechanism. In the usual presentation, the Higgs field has a potential that appears to give the Higgs field a non-vanishing vacuum expectation value. However, this is merely a consequence of imposing a gauge fixing, usually the unitary gauge. Any value of the vacuum expectation value can be acquired by an appropriate gauge fixing choice. Calculating the expectation value in a gauge invariant way always gives zero, in agreement with Elitzur's theorem. The Higgs mechanism can however be reformulated entirely in a gauge invariant way in what is known as the Fröhlich–Morchio–Strocchi mechanism which does not involve spontaneous symmetry breaking of any symmetry, which is a special case of the dressing field method of gauge symmetry reduction. For non-abelian gauge groups that have a $\text{SU}(2)$ subgroup, this mechanism agrees with the Higgs mechanism, but for other gauge groups there can appear discrepancies between the two approaches.

Elitzur's theorem can also be generalized to a larger notion of local symmetries where in a D-dimensional space, there can be symmetries that act uniformly on a d-dimensional hyperplanes. In this view, global symmetries act on D-dimensional hyperplanes while local symmetries act on 0-dimensional ones. The generalized Elitzur's theorem then provides bounds on the vacuum expectation values of operators that are non-invariant under such d-dimensional symmetries. This theorem has numerous applications in condensed matter systems where such symmetries appear.

== See also ==
- Mermin–Wagner theorem
