= Racah Institute of Physics =

Institute at the Hebrew University of Jerusalem

- מכון רקח לפיסיקה
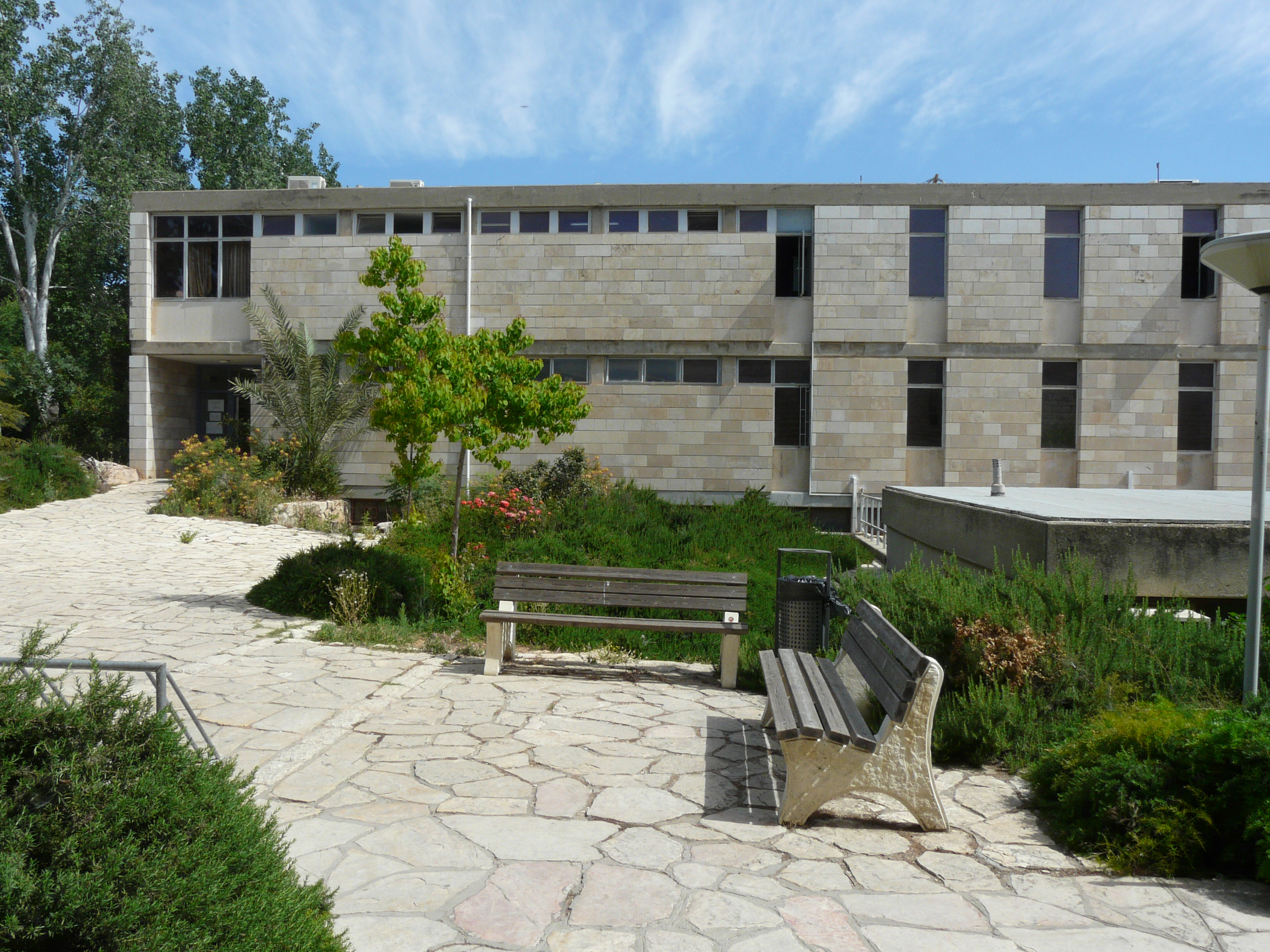
- Racah Institute of Physics
- Field of research: Physics
- Location: Edmond J. Safra Campus; Givat Ram, Jerusalem, 9190401; 31.775°N 35.198°E
- Operating agency: Hebrew University of Jerusalem
- Website: phys.huji.ac.il

The Racah Institute of Physics (Hebrew: מכון רקח לפיסיקה) is an institute at the Hebrew University of Jerusalem, part of the faculty of Mathematics and Natural Sciences on the Edmund J. Safra Campus in the Givat Ram neighborhood of Jerusalem.

The institute is the center for all research and teaching in the various fields of physics at the Hebrew University. These include astrophysics, high energy physics, quantum physics, nuclear physics, solid state physics, laser and plasma physics, biophysics, non-linear and statistical physics, and nanophysics. Both experimental and theoretical research is carried on in these fields.

== History ==
In 1913, before the opening of the Hebrew University, first steps towards physics research in Jerusalem were taken by Chaim Weizmann. Weizmann, the president of the Zionist Organisation, and the major figure in the planning and founding of the Hebrew University contacted Leonard Ornstein, the known physicist from Utrecht, the Netherlands, to prepare plans for physics research at the upcoming university. After the university was officially opened, he became the chairman of the physics group for several years, acting from his seat at Utrecht. In the year 1923, two years before its official opening, Albert Einstein gave a talk on Mount Scopus, the first campus of the university, on his theory of relativity. This talk was considered by many as the opening talk of the Hebrew University. Einstein, who supported actively the foundation and development of the Hebrew University in Jerusalem since 1919 and throughout his entire life, was particularly active in helping to establish a good physics institute. The known mathematician, Abraham Fraenkel, who was on the governing board and served later as dean and rector of the university, invested great efforts looking for an excellent physicist to take the chair of theoretical physics in Jerusalem. He corresponded extensively with Einstein on this matter, seeking advice on the various possible candidates.

The first experimental physicist to be appointed (in 1928) was Shmuel Sambursky. He carried out his experiments in atomic spectroscopy during his visits to Ornstein's laboratory in Utrecht. His teaching duties consisted of the courses in classical experimental physics. In later years he became a well known historian of physics. In 1933 Ernst Alexander joined the experimental physics department and a year later – Guenther Wolfson. Both had to leave their posts in Germany due to the new racial laws, in spite of being highly appraised experimental physicists there. Both of them contributed substantially to the creation of an experimental infrastructure for physics research in Jerusalem. In 1934 the already known nuclear physicist George Placzek accepted a position in the department. After a few months in Jerusalem he left due to the lack of the experimental facilities which he considered necessary for his research.

During the years 1935–38, several great physicists were offered the chair in theoretical physics. Felix Bloch, Eugene Wigner and Fritz London considered the offer seriously, everyone in his turn, after they had to leave their positions in Europe. They all declined after lengthy negotiations for differing personal reasons. Finally, Giulio (Yoel) Racah, a young professor in Pisa, Italy, was appointed. He was highly recommended by his teacher and mentor Enrico Fermi, as well as by Wolfgang Pauli, Niels Bohr and others. As a Zionist he was determined to come and teach in Hebrew in Jerusalem. He turned the theoretical physics department in Jerusalem into a world center for atomic spectroscopy. He died in an accident in 1965, age 56. Five years later, in 1970, experimental and theoretical physics departments were united into one new Institute named after Racah.

=== Early research ===
In a series of groundbreaking papers, Racah developed the mathematical methods, which are now textbook methods, for the calculation of the spectra of complex atoms. This work was carried out in Jerusalem in complete scientific isolation during the years of World War II. In this work he pioneered the use of symmetries and group theory for these calculations. Theoretical atomic spectroscopy was also the subject of most of his students and visitors. However, some of his best students started to apply his elaborate methods to the young science of nuclear spectroscopy. In Jerusalem, Nissan Zeldes, who became the world expert in the theory of nuclear masses, and Gideon Rakavy. Two of Racah's students, Amos de-Shalit and Igal Talmi, became the world leaders in theoretical nuclear spectroscopy. They founded the nuclear physics department at the Weizmann Institute in Rehovot. As mentioned, experimental physics was carried out from the late 1920s, first by Sambursky in atomic spectroscopy then by Alexander and Wolfson in X-ray spectroscopy, crystallography and optics. In 1950 William Low (Ze'ev Lev), who was a student of Charles Townes in the United States, joined the experimental physics. He started new fields of research in Jerusalem. Starting to work on microwaves, he then set up a laboratory for magnetic resonance research. He also pioneered cryogenics and laser physics in Jerusalem. Nuclear magnetic resonance followed, including its medical application. Abraham Halperin and Abraham Many, two of Racah's early graduates, started new research directions in the physics of the solid state. They did experimental research on the optical and electrical properties of insulators and semiconductors, as well as the surface properties of solids. These fields of research were just starting to thrive along with the birth of the transistor. An important addition to the experimental group was Solly G. Cohen from England. He joined the physics in 1949 and became its first nuclear experimentalist measuring very long lived radionuclides as well as extremely short lived nuclear states. In the early sixties his interests shifted to the newly discovered Mossbauer effect, and established a research group which turned Jerusalem into a world center in this field.

Many graduates of the Racah Institute (and the physics departments which preceded it) became leading professors and scientists (including a Nobel Laureate) in Israel and all over the world. During its existence the Institute enjoyed visits of many important physicists from all over the world. Niels Bohr, Paul Dirac, Wolfgang Pauli, Robert Oppenheimer, John Wheeler and Stephen Hawking, to mention just a few. All Wolf Prize winners and a great number of Nobel Laureates were amongst the visitors.

=== Current research ===
Current research at the Racah Institute covers the fields of astrophysics, high energy physics, nuclear physics, condensed matter physics, statistical physics, nonlinear physics, biophysics, quantum optics, quantum information and computational neuroscience.

==== Condensed matter physics ====
Condensed matter physics at the Racah Institute contains both a strong theoretical and an experimental effort. Most investigations are performed within the expansive field of many-body physics, with particular emphasis on nonequilibrium phenomena, the effects of decoherence and dissipation, the study of low-dimensional systems, and glassy systems, to name but a few subjects. Another direction of research includes statistical physics applied, for example, to reaction diffusion systems, especially in cases where fluctuations have an important effect.

Within the realm of theory, the methods being employed range from various field theoretic methods, both exact and perturbative, to numerical methods and exact methods based on the theory of both classical and quantum integrability. These concepts and methods are applied to a variety of physical systems, such as quantum impurity problems (realized, e.g., in quantum dots), the fractional quantum Hall effect, one-dimensional fermionic gases, Anderson transitions, and superconductivity, including special aspects related to high-T_{c} superconductivity.

On the experimental side, benefiting from the facilities of the Harvey M. Krueger center for nanoscience and nanotechnology, researchers apply modern measuring and fabrication techniques to study the physics of nano-structures, their application to quantum information processing, the interaction of light and matter, high-T_{c} superconductivity, and the physics of electron glasses. More specifically, and summarizing but a few of the research directions, researchers study excitonic fluids in semiconductor nanostructures with an eye on both a better physical understanding of their macroscopic quantum coherence properties and possible future applications in electro-optic devices. Josephson junctions are being studied in order to expose and optimize the conditions that allow for long-lived macroscopic quantum coherence, and to clarify the processes that lead to noise and decoherence. Electron glasses are being studied in order to understand the underlying mechanisms that lead to their peculiar properties, specifically the interplay of interactions, disorder and nonequilibrium, as well as how these are manifested in transport properties.

==== High Energy Physics ====
High Energy Physics (HEP) research includes both HEP theory and particle phenomenology.

One of the current activities of the High Energy Physics group at the Racah Institute of Physics involves the fundamental laws of nature, touching upon both Quantum Field Theory and General relativity (Einstein's gravity) together with the geometry and mathematics which underlie them. Evaluation of Feynman diagrams lies at the computational core of Quantum Field Theory, yet despite considerable progress over more than 70 years a general and full theory is not available. Research in the group addresses this issue. This research line grew out of an approach to solving the two-body problem in Einstein's gravity in the post-Newtonian limit through a (classical) effective field theory, a problem which is essential for detection of interpretation of gravitational waves. In this approach Feynman diagrams are used to compute the two-body effective action.

A second research area is focused on physics beyond the Standard Model of the electro-weak and the strong interactions. Examples include models of Supersymmetry-breaking and its mediation to Supersymmetric extensions of the Standard Model, with an emphasize on models whose properties may allow a relatively early discovery at the Large Hadron Collider at CERN, models of extra dimensions and their potential signatures at the LHC and future colliders, as well as their embedding in string theory, the dynamics of Supersymmetric theories and Supersymmetry-breaking, the interplay between gauge theory and its embedding on brane constructions in string theory, the physics of black holes and the early universe in string theory, and its interplay with brane dynamics and gauge theory, e.g. via the Anti-de-Sitter/Conformal-Field-Theory correspondence, as well as various aspects of the underlying structure of string theory.

A third research area addresses quantum entanglement in Quantum Field Theory.

==== The Nonlinear and Statistical Physics ====
The Nonlinear and Statistical Physics group pursues extensive theoretical and experimental studies, trying to understand the behavior of complex non-equilibrium systems. The subjects are diverse and span from plasma, laser and atomic physics to physics of materials and biophysics. Specific research areas include the fundamental physics of fracture and frictional motion, elasticity of growing objects, theory of large fluctuations in systems far from equilibrium, theory and applications of autoresonance, nonequilibrium statistical physics of ultrashort laser pulse formation, and semiclassical wave packet theory of cavity/circuit quantum electrodynamics and cold atom physics.

==== Quantum Information ====
Quantum Information is researched both experimentally and theoretically at the Racah institute. The experimental implementations include atomic, photonic, semiconductor and superconducting realizations. Entanglement and the production of single photons is actively pursued. On the theoretical side, fundamental questions of entanglement and its characterization are investigated. Another topic of research is the theory of dynamical control of ion traps and Nitrogen vacancies in Diamond.

== Notable professors ==
- Nathalie Q. Balaban, biophysics (experiment)
- Ofer Biham, statistical physics, computational physics and biophysics (theory)
- Avishai Dekel, astrophysics (theory) physics (theory)
- Barak Kol, high-energy physics (theory)
- Tsvi Piran, astrophysics (theory))
- Nir Shaviv, astrophysics (theory)
- Haim Sompolinsky, neuroscience
- Amri Wandel, astrophysics (theory)
- Hanoch Gutfreund
- Eliezer Rabinovici

== See also ==
- Racah Lectures in Physics
- Giulio Racah
- Weizmann Institute of Science
