= Pohlmeyer charge =

Invariant charge of the Virasoro algebra

In theoretical physics Pohlmeyer charge, named for Klaus Pohlmeyer, is a conserved charge invariant under the Virasoro algebra or its generalization. It can be obtained by expanding the holonomies (generating functions)

$$P\,Tr\, \exp i T_\mu\oint d\sigma A_\sigma^{(\mu)}(\sigma)$$

with respect to the constant matrices T. The gauge field $A_\sigma^\mu$ is defined as a combination of $\partial X^\mu$ and its conjugate.

According to the logic of loop quantum gravity and algebraic quantum field theory, these charges are the right physical quantities that should be used for quantization. This logic is however incompatible with the standard and well-established methods of quantum field theory based on Fock space and perturbation theory.

== See also ==
- Wilson loop
