= The Theoretical Minimum =

Book by Leonard Susskind

- Hardcover edition
- Author: Leonard Susskind, George Hrabovsky
- Language: English
- Genre: Popular science
- Publisher: Basic Books
- Publication date: January 29, 2013
- Publication place: United States
- Media type: Print, e-book, audiobook
- Pages: 256 pp.
- ISBN: 978-0465028115

The Theoretical Minimum: What You Need to Know to Start Doing Physics is a popular science book by Leonard Susskind and George Hrabovsky. The book was first published on January 29, 2013 by Basic Books.

The book was the first in a series which now consists of four books, covering the first four of six core courses devoted to classical mechanics, quantum mechanics, special relativity and classical field theory, general relativity, cosmology, and statistical mechanics. Videos for all of these courses are available online. In addition, Susskind has made available video lectures over a range of supplement subject areas including advanced quantum mechanics, the Higgs boson, quantum entanglement, string theory, and black holes. The full series delivers over 100 lectures, with some of the individual lectures having received over a million YouTube views.

== What You Need to Know book overview ==
The book is a mathematical introduction to various theoretical physics concepts, such as principle of least action, Lagrangian mechanics, Hamiltonian mechanics, Poisson brackets, and electromagnetism. It is the first book in a series called The Theoretical Minimum, based on Stanford Continuing Studies courses taught by physicist Leonard Susskind. The courses collectively seek to provide a basic understanding of each area of modern physics, including much of the fundamental mathematics.

== Full lecture series ==
=== Core Course 1: Classical Mechanics ===
The book, also published in 2014 by Penguin Books under the title Classical Mechanics: The Theoretical Minimum (ISBN 978-0141976228), is complemented by video recordings of the complete lectures. There is also a supplemental website for the book.

=== Core Course 2: Quantum Mechanics ===
The second book in the series, by Susskind and Art Friedman, was published in 2014 by Basic Books under the title Quantum Mechanics: The Theoretical Minimum (ISBN 978-0465062904).

=== Core Course 3: Special Relativity and Classical Field Theory ===
The third book in the series, by Susskind and Friedman, was published in 2017. It covers special relativity and classical field theory.

=== Core Course 4: General Relativity ===
The fourth book in the series, by Susskind and André Cabannes, was published in January 2023. It covers the general theory of relativity.

=== Core Courses 5-6 ===
Lectures in the remaining two courses, on the subjects of Cosmology and Statistical mechanics, are available as video recordings, or in written notes.

=== Supplemental courses ===
Further lecture courses in the Theoretical Minimum series have been delivered by Susskind, with the following titles:

- Advanced quantum mechanics
- Higgs boson
- Quantum entanglement
- Relativity
- Particle Physics 1: Basic Concepts
- Particle Physics 2: Standard Model
- Particle Physics 3: Super-symmetry and Grand Unification
- String theory
- Cosmology and black holes
