= Nathalie Q. Balaban =

Israeli biophysicist and systems biologist

Nathalie Q. Balaban (Hebrew: נטלי בלבן) is an Israeli biophysicist and systems biologist. She is a full professor at the Racah Institute of Physics at the Hebrew University of Jerusalem. and a member of the European Academy of Microbiology (EAM), the American Academy of Microbiology (AAM) and the European Molecular Biology Organization (EMBO).

== Education and career ==
Balaban completed her PhD degree in Condensed Matter Physics at the Weizmann Institute. She first became interested in biophysics and studied mechanical forces in cells with Benny Geiger in 2000. She then joined Stanislas Leibler’s lab in Princeton University as a postdoctoral researcher, where she was a Robert H. Dicke Fellow. Since 2003, she has been a faculty member in the Physics Department of the Hebrew University. Her research today focuses on the biophysical description of the responses of bacteria under antibiotic treatments, and their implications for understanding treatment failure and evolution of resistance

== Recognition ==
- The Krill prize from the Wolf Foundation for Excellence in Scientific Research in 2009.
- The Klachky Prize for the Advancement of the Frontiers of Science in 2016.
- Elected member of the European Academy of Microbiology (EAM) in 2016.
- Elected Fellow of the American Academy of Microbiology (AAM) in 2018.
- Elected Member of the European Molecular Biology Organization (EMBO) in 2021
- Excelling researcher in all research fields at the Hebrew University for the year of 2022

== Dissemination ==
Balaban initiated and established, together with Professor Eran Sharon the "Scholar-Teacher" which creates academic research positions at the Hebrew University that include also part-time science teaching in high schools for the advancement of science teaching.

== Selected publications ==
- Yoav Kaplan, Shaked Reich, Elyaqim Oster, Shani Maoz, Irit Levin-Reisman, Irine Ronin, Orit Gefen, Oded Agam, Nathalie Q Balaban (2021). "Observation of universal ageing dynamics in antibiotic persistence." Nature 600: pages 290-294.
- NQ Balaban, J Merrin, R Chait, L Kowalik, S Leibler (2004). "Bacterial persistence as a phenotypic switch." Science 305: 1622-1625.
- A Brauner, O Fridman, O Gefen, NQ Balaban (2016) "Distinguishing between resistance, tolerance and persistence to antibiotic treatment." Nature Reviews Microbiology 14: 320-330.
- NQ Balaban, S Helaine, K Lewis, M Ackermann, B Aldridge, DI Andersson, ... (2019). "Definitions and guidelines for research on antibiotic persistence." Nature Reviews Microbiology 17: 441-448.
- Oded Sandler, Sivan Pearl Mizrahi, Noga Weiss, Oded Agam, Itamar Simon, Nathalie Q Balaban (2015). "Lineage correlations of single cell division time as a probe of cell-cycle dynamics." Nature 519: 468–471.
- O Fridman, A Goldberg, I Ronin, N Shoresh, NQ Balaban (2014). "Optimization of lag time underlies antibiotic tolerance in evolved bacterial populations." Nature 513: pages 418–42.
- Irit Levin-Reisman, Irine Ronin, Orit Gefen, Ilan Braniss, Noam Shoresh, Nathalie Q Balaban (2017). "Antibiotic tolerance facilitates the evolution of resistance." Science 355: pages 826-830.
