= Charge invariance =

Principle in particle physics

Charge invariance refers to the fixed value of the electric charge of a particle regardless of its motion. Like mass, total spin and magnetic moment, particle's charge quantum number remains unchanged between two reference frames in relative motion. For example, an electron has a specific charge e, total spin $\tfrac{\hbar}{2}$, and invariant mass m_{e}. Accelerate that electron, and the charge, spin and mass assigned to it in all physical laws in the frame at rest and the moving frame remain the same – e, $\tfrac{\hbar}{2}$, m_{e}. In contrast, the particle's total relativistic energy or de Broglie wavelength change values between the reference frames.

The origin of charge invariance, and all relativistic invariants, is presently unclear. There may be some hints proposed by string/M-theory. It is possible the concept of charge invariance may provide a key to unlocking the mystery of unification in physics – the single theory of gravity, electromagnetism, the strong, and weak nuclear forces.

The property of charge invariance is embedded in the charge density – current density four-vector $j^\mu = \left(c\rho, \vec{j}\right)$, whose vanishing divergence $\partial_\mu j^\mu = 0$ then signifies charge conservation.

== See also ==
- Charge conservation
- Pohlmeyer charge
