= Barak Kol (physicist) =

Israeli high-energy physicist

- ברק קול
- Born: August 1968 (age 57–58); Cleveland, Ohio, USA
- Citizenship: Israeli, American
- Education: Tel Aviv University (BSc, 1989); Stanford University (PhD, 1998).
- Scientific career
- Thesis: (P, Q) webs in string theory (1998)
- Doctoral advisor: Leonard Susskind

Barak Kol (Hebrew: ברק קול; born August 1968) is an Israeli theoretical physicist who studies fundamental laws, high-energy physics, and general relativity. He holds the Michael Polak chair in theoretical physics at the Racah Institute of Physics at the Hebrew University of Jerusalem.

== Biography ==
Kol completed his BSc in physics and mathematics at Tel Aviv University in 1989, following which he did his military service in the IDF. Afterwards, he completed his PhD at Stanford University in 1998 under the guidance of Leonard Susskind, during which he coined the term "(p,q) webs." His most widely cited paper is on the subject and has over 500 citations.

Following the completion of his PhD, Kol was a postdoctoral fellow at Tel Aviv University (1998-2000) and at the Institute for Advanced Study (2000-2002). During the latter, he was hosted by Nathan Seiberg. Afterwards, he became a faculty member at the Racah Institute of Physics.

Kol's previous research topics include phase transitions in black strings, effective field theories in general relativity, black holes in string theory, and the three-body problem.

He was previously Head of the Physics Studies at the Racah Institute.
