= Project Tuva =

2009 research project between Bill Gates and Microsoft Research

Project Tuva was a collaborative research project between Bill Gates and Microsoft Research in 2009 demonstrating the potential value of an interactive video player platform for learning.

== Overview ==
The platform hosted the Messenger Lectures series titled The Character of Physical Law given at Cornell University by Richard Feynman in 1964 and recorded by the BBC. According to his video introduction, Gates saw the lectures when he was younger. He enjoyed the physics concepts and Feynman's lecturing style, and later acquired the rights to make the video available to the public. He hopes that this will encourage others to make educational content available for free.

Project Tuva was officially released at the Microsoft Research Faculty Summit, July 13 and 14, 2009. At its inception, Project Tuva included video of the lectures with expert commentary from Stephen D. Ellis of the University of Washington and the Student Physics Society at the University of Washington. The Silverlight application also includes text search over transcripts (which are shown synchronized with the video), support for time-stamped note-taking, and "Extras" that complement the video with external links, formulae, interactive demonstrations, and embedded WorldWide Telescope astronomical objects and tours. Upon release the Extras and commentary were only available for the first of the seven lectures: The Law of Gravitation - An Example of Physical Law. In April 2011, Tuva was updated with new content and extras curated by MIT Jane and Otto Morningstar Professor of Physics Robert Jaffe. Then, in July 2016, the Project Tuva Silverlight application was retired.

The project gets its name from a late-life goal of Feynman's; namely, that he would someday travel to the Siberian land of Tuva. He was never allowed to travel to Tuva during his lifetime, with permission from the Soviet government coming the day following his death. The name then invokes the idea that a dream of his is now accomplished – not, of course, traveling to Tuva, but rather that the world may now be able to appreciate physics the way he did.

== Content released under Project Tuva ==
Content Number	Title	Narrated By	Duration	Link
Introduction	Richard Feynman: Making Science Easy	Bill Gates	2:16	
#1	Law of Gravitation — An Example of Physical Law	Richard Feynman	55:37	
#2	The Relation of Mathematics and Physics	Richard Feynman	55:32	
#3	The Great Conservation Principles	Richard Feynman	56:03	
#4	Symmetry in Physical Law	Richard Feynman	57:06	
#5	The Distinction of the Past and Future	Richard Feynman	46:00	
#6	Probability and Uncertainty – The Quantum Mechanical View of Nature	Richard Feynman	56:32	
#7	Seeking New Laws	Richard Feynman	57:56	
