= Hamiltonian lattice gauge theory =

Lattice field theory with only spatial discretization

In physics, Hamiltonian lattice gauge theory is a calculational approach to gauge theory and a special case of lattice gauge theory in which the space is discretized but time is not. The Hamiltonian is then re-expressed as a function of degrees of freedom defined on a d-dimensional lattice.

Following Wilson, the spatial components of the vector potential are replaced with Wilson lines over the edges, but the time component is associated with the vertices. However, the temporal gauge is often employed, setting the electric potential to zero. The eigenvalues of the Wilson line operators U(e) (where e is the (oriented) edge in question) take on values on the Lie group G. It is assumed that G is compact, otherwise we run into many problems. The conjugate operator to U(e) is the electric field E(e) whose eigenvalues take on values in the Lie algebra $\mathfrak{g}$. The Hamiltonian receives contributions coming from the plaquettes (the magnetic contribution) and contributions coming from the edges (the electric contribution).

Hamiltonian lattice gauge theory is exactly dual to a theory of spin networks. This involves using the Peter–Weyl theorem. In the spin network basis, the spin network states are eigenstates of the operator $Tr[E(e)^2]$.
