= Messenger Lectures =

Lectures given at Cornell University by external lecturers

The Messenger Lectures are a series of talks given by scholars and public figures at Cornell University. They were funded in 1924 by a gift from Hiram Messenger of "a fund to provide a course of lectures on the Evolution of Civilization for the special purpose of raising the moral standard of our political, business, and social life", to be "delivered by the ablest non-resident lecturer or lecturers obtainable". The lecture series has been described as one of Cornell's most important of extracurricular activities.

Initially a series of twelve lectures per year, there are now either three or six lectures by one speaker each semester.

Archeologist James Henry Breasted delivered the first series of Messenger Lectures in 1925.

== Hiram Messenger ==
Dr. Hiram John Messenger Jr (July 6, 1855 - Dec. 15, 1913; B. Litt., Phd,) was from Hartford, Connecticut and graduated from Cornell in 1880. He was a teacher of mathematics Associate Professor of Mathematics at the University of the City of New York and an actuary of the Traveler's Insurance Company. The gift he left to Cornell was part of $4,000 mentioned in his will and a portion of his estate goes to Cornell each year. He was himself the youngest son of Hiram J. Messenger, a mercantile businessman and owner of banks.

== The lectures ==
See the list of Messenger Lectures at Cornell University for a complete list

There have been over 80 talks given since 1924, the most famous of which is probably Richard Feynman's 7 lecture series in 1964, The Character of Physical Law, the videos of which were bought and made available to the public by Bill Gates in 2009.

A partial listing of some of the lecturers over the years is provided in Cornell's Messenger Lectures brochure as:

- Scott Aaronson (2017)
- Michael Moss (2016)
- Cecilia Vicuña (2015)
- Leonard Susskind (2014)
- Nima Arkani-Hamed (2010)
- Steven Weinberg (2007)
- Sir Martin Rees (2005)
- Maynard Solomon (1992)
- Susan Moller Okin (1989)
- Peter Nye (1989)
- Edward W. Said (1986)
- Quentin Skinner (1983)
- Jean Seznec (1978)
- Noam Chomsky (1976)
- Edward O. Wilson (1976)
- Richard Feynman (1964)
- 1960-1961 Fred Hoyle, Astronomy, University of Cambridge
- 1959-1960 Linus Pauling, Chemistry, California Institute of Technology
- 1959-1960 Arthur F. Burns, Economics, Columbia University
- 1958-1959 Vincent Wigglesworth, Zoology, University of Cambridge
- 1957-1958 Guido Pontecorvo, Genetics, University of Glasgow
- 1957-1958 Paul Tillich, Religion, Harvard University
- 1956-1957 W. K. C. Guthrie, Classics, University of Cambridge
- 1956-1957 Alfred L. Kroeber, Anthropology, University of California
- 1955-1956 Edward C. Kirkland, History, Bowdoin College
- 1955-1956 Arthur J. Altmeyer, Louis I. Dublin, Edward J. Stieglitz, Gerontology
- 1954-1955 Philip Kuenen, Submarine Geology, Groningen, the Netherlands
- 1954-1955 Alpheus T. Mason, Government, Princeton University
- 1953-1954 Luther Gulick, Public Administration, New York
- 1953-1954 C. B. van Niel, Bacteriology, Stanford University
- 1952-1953 Joseph Wood Krutch, Drama, Columbia University
- 1952-1953 Theodore von Karman, Engineering, California Institute of Technology
- 1951-1952 Otto Struve, Astronomy, Yerkes Observatory
- 1951-1952 Robert Redfield, Anthropology, University of Chicago
- 1950-1951 William F. Albright, Archaeology, Johns Hopkins University
- 1950-1951 Thomas A. Bailey, Russian-American Relations, Stanford University
- 1950-1951 Jens Clausen, Botany, Stanford University
- 1949-1950 Otto E. Neugebauer, History of Mathematics, Brown University
- 1949-1950 Vincent du Vigneaud, Biochemistry, Cornell Medical College
- 1948-1949 Otto Kinkeldey, Musicology, Harvard University
- 1948-1949 Harvey Fletcher, Acoustics, Bell Telephone Laboratories
- 1947-1948 Howard Mumford Jones, American Literature, Harvard University
- 1947-1948 Catherine Bauer, Housing, University of Cambridge
- 1947-1948 Marjorie Hope Nicolson, English Literature, Columbia University
- 1946-1947 Sumner Slichter, Economics, Harvard University
- 1945-1946 Hu Shih, History of Chinese Philosophy, Peking
- 1945-1946 J. Robert Oppenheimer, Atomic Physics, California Inst. Of Technology
- 1945-1946 C. C. Little, L. H. Snyder, H. J. Muller, Gene
- 1944-1945 Douglas Bush, English Literature, Harvard University
- 1944-1945 T. R. McConnell, W. H. Cowley, W. DeVane, Higher Education
- 1944-1945 Charles E. Kellogg, Agronomy, U.S. Department of Agriculture
- 1944-1945 Lydia Roberts, Nutrition, University of Chicago
- 1943-1944 Griffith Taylor, Geography, Toronto
- 1942-1943 Carl L. Becker, Cornell History, Cornell University
- 1942-1943 H. Peyre, French Literature, Yale University
- 1941-1942 H. M. Evans, Endocrinology, University of California
- 1941-1942 T. M. River and others, Virus Diseases, Rockefeller Institute
- 1940-1941 F. A. Pottle, Modern Poetry, Yale University
- 1940-1941 H. E. Sigerist, History of Medicine, Johns Hopkins University
- 1939-1940 T. D. Kendrick, Archaeology, British Museum
- 1938-1939 G. P. Adams, Philosophy, University of California
- 1938-1939 G. H. McIlwain, History of Political Theory, Harvard University
- 1937-1938 E. J. Dent, Musicology, University of Cambridge
- 1936-1937 Isaiah Bowman, Geography, Johns Hopkins University
- 1936-1937 Robert Hegner, Parasitology, Johns Hopkins University
- 1935-1936 W. M. Calder, History of Christianity, University of Edinburgh
- 1934-1935 W. C. Mitchell, Economics, Columbia University
- 1933-1934 Sir Arthur Eddington, Astronomy, University of Cambridge
- 1932-1933 B. Malinowski, Anthropology, London
- 1931-1932 F. J. Mather, Fine Arts, Princeton University
- 1930-1931 T. H. Morgan, Genetics, California Institute of Technology
- 1929-1930 Roscoe Pound, Law, Harvard University
- 1928-1929 E. L. Thorndike, Psychology, Columbia University
- 1927-1928 T. F. Tout, English History, Manchester
- 1926-1927 H. J. C. Grierson, English Literature, University of Edinburgh
- 1925-1926 R. A. Millikan, Physics, California Institute of Technology
- 1924-1925 J. H. Breasted, Ancient History, Chicago

== See also ==
- Project Tuva
