= Susskind–Glogower operator =

The Susskind–Glogower operator, first proposed by Leonard Susskind and Jonathan Glogower, refers to the operator where the phase is introduced as an approximate polar decomposition of the creation and annihilation operators.

It is defined as

$$V=\frac{1}{\sqrt{aa^{\dagger}}}a$$,

and its adjoint

$$V^{\dagger}=a^{\dagger}\frac{1}{\sqrt{aa^{\dagger}}}$$.

Their commutation relation is

$$[V,V^{\dagger}]=|0\rangle\langle 0|$$,

where $|0\rangle$ is the vacuum state of the harmonic oscillator.

They may be regarded as a (exponential of) phase operator because

$$Va^{\dagger}a V^{\dagger}=a^{\dagger}a+1$$,

where $a^{\dagger}a$ is the number operator. So the exponential of the phase operator displaces the number operator in the same fashion as the momentum operator acts as the generator of translations in quantum mechanics: $\exp\left(i\frac{\hat{p}x_o}{\hbar}\right)\hat{x}\exp\left(-i\frac{\hat{p}x_o}{\hbar}\right)=\hat{x}+x_0$.

They may be used to solve problems such as atom-field interactions, level-crossings or to define some class of non-linear coherent states, among others.
