= Avishai Dekel =

Israeli astrophysicist (1951–2025)

- אבישי דקל
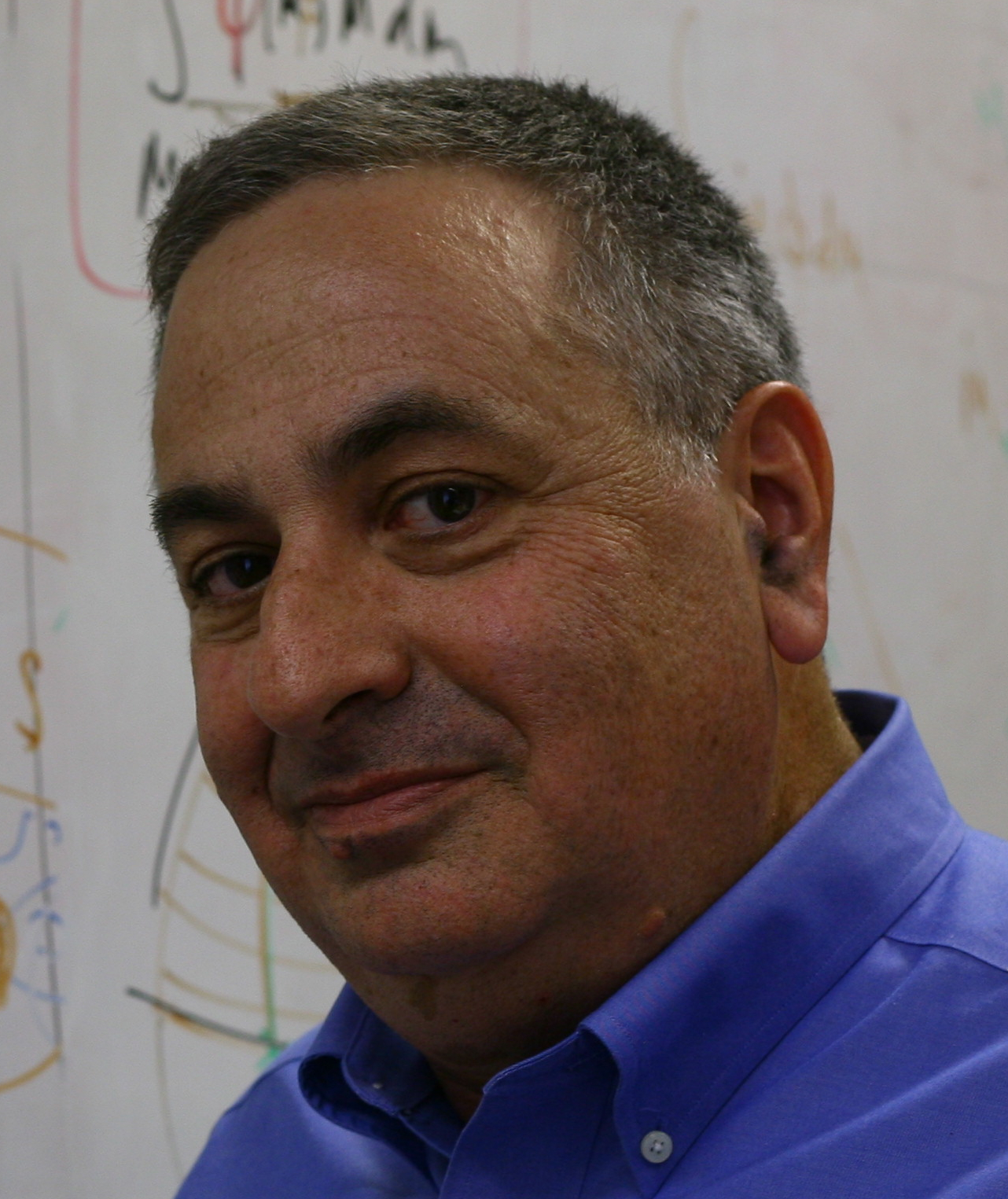
- Born: January 13, 1951; Jerusalem
- Died: November 17, 2025 (aged 74)
- Website: phys.huji.ac.il/~dekel
- Academic career

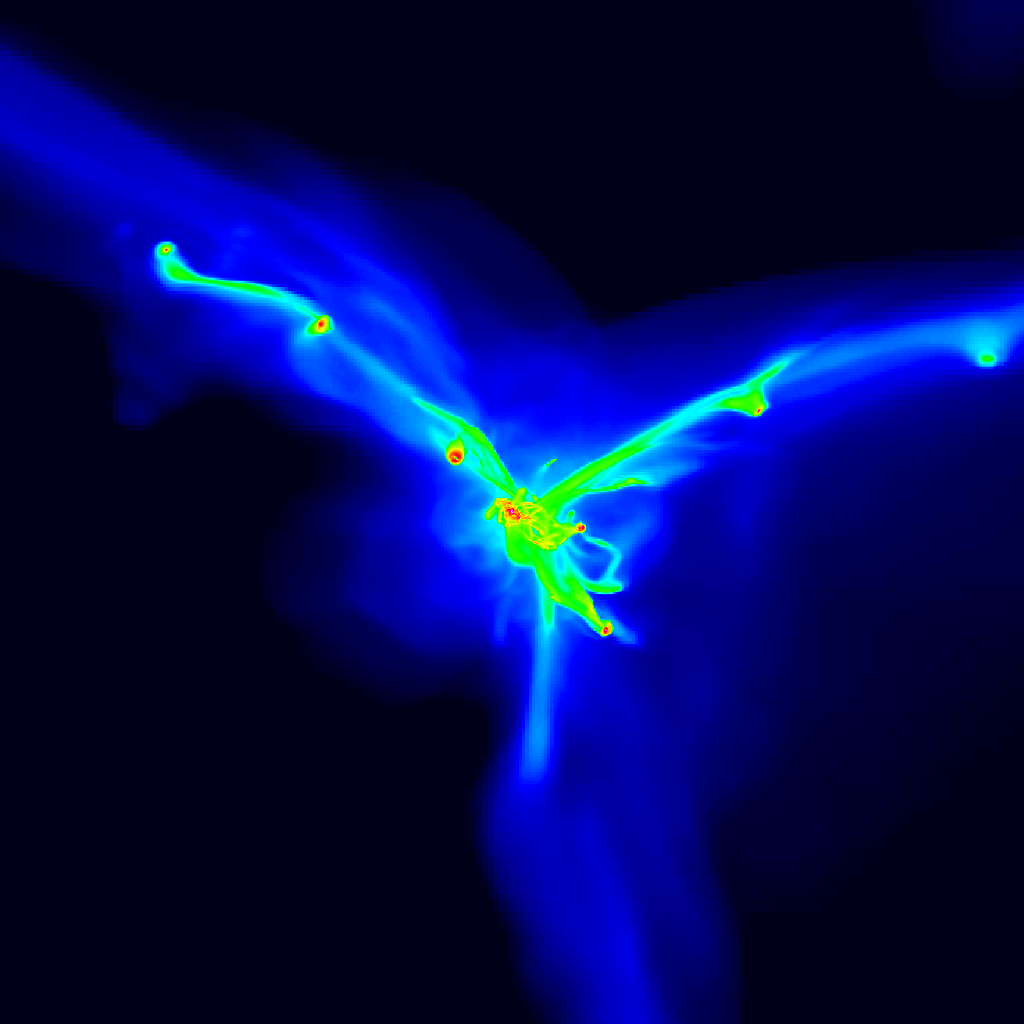
Cold streams from the cosmic web feeding a galaxy in the early universe, based on a hydro-cosmological computer simulation (Dekel et al., 2011) The picture shows gas density, extending to a half a million light years, when the Universe was 3 billion years old.

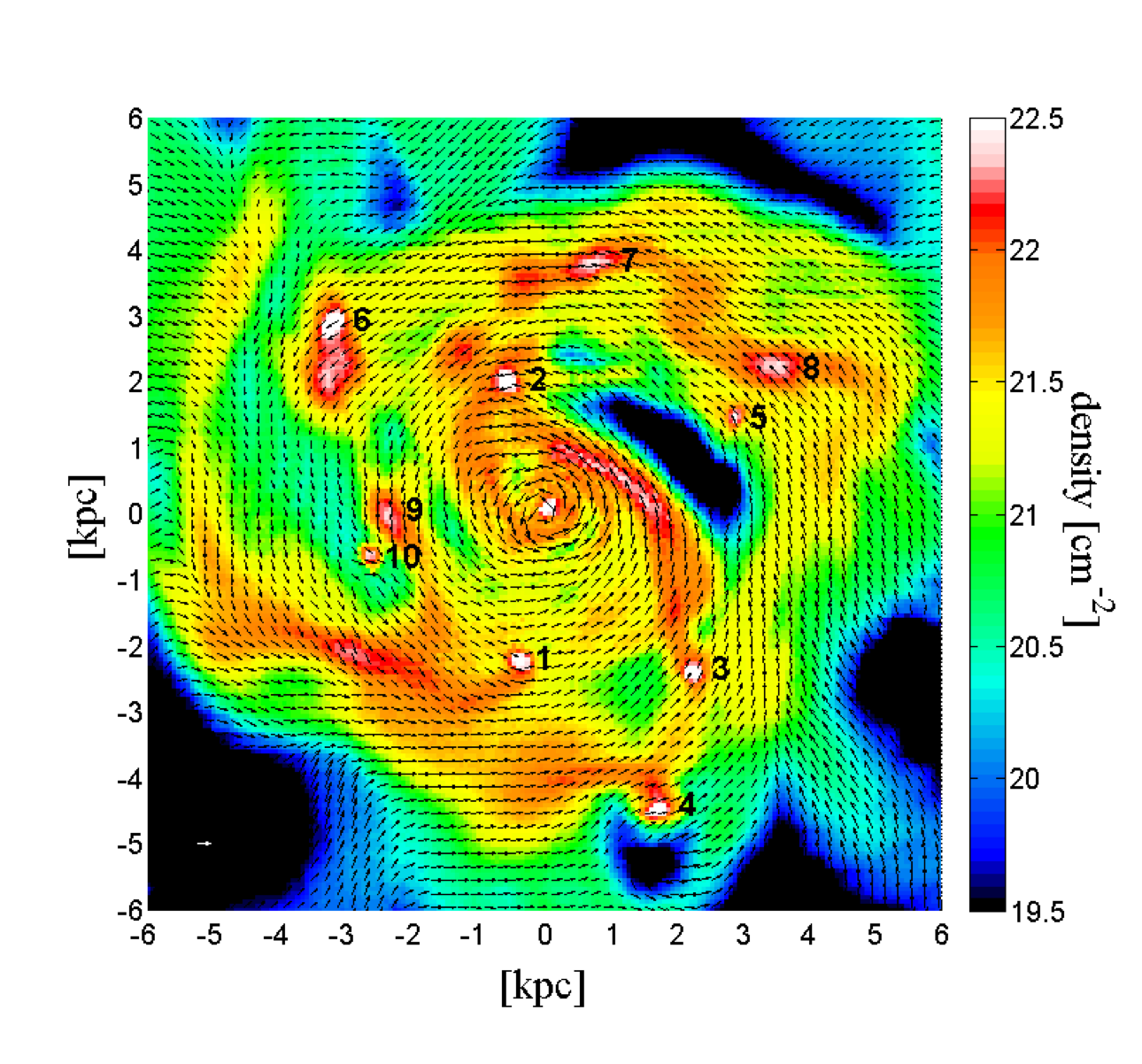
Violent gravitational Instability in a disk galaxy in the early universe, based on a hydro-cosmological computer simulation (Dekel et al., 2011) The picture of gas density shows that the disk is fragmented to giant clumps where stars form. The disk radius is 30,000 light years.

Avishai Dekel (Hebrew: אבישי דקל; January 13, 1951 – November 17, 2025) was an Israeli astrophysicist who was a professor of physics at the Hebrew University of Jerusalem, holding the Andre Aisenstadt Chair of Theoretical Physics. His primary research interests were in astrophysics and cosmology.

== Life and career ==
Dekel earned his Ph.D. from the Hebrew University in 1980, and was a research fellow at Caltech and assistant professor at Yale University before joining the faculty of the Hebrew University in 1986.

He served as the Head of The Racah Institute of Physics (1997–2001), the Dean of the Authority for the Community and Youth at the Hebrew University (2005–2011), and the President of the Israel Physical Society (2008–11). He headed the university computing committee, was a member of the executive committee of the board of trustees and a member of the standing committee of the Hebrew University.

Dekel was awarded a Visiting Miller Professorship at UC Berkeley, a Blaise Pascal International Chair of Research by the École Normale Supérieure in Paris (2004–06), and a Lagrange fellowship in IAP Paris (2015–16). He was elected as a fellow of the Israel Physical Society (2019), and was awarded the Landau Prize for Arts and Sciences (2020).

Dekel is known for his contributions to research in cosmology, especially the study of the formation of galaxies and large-scale structure in the Universe, which is dominated by dark energy and dark matter. His expertise was dwarf galaxies and supernova feedback (1986, 2003), large-scale cosmic flows and early estimates of fundamental cosmological parameters (1989-2001), the structure of dark-matter galactic halos (2000–2003), and the theory of galaxy formation (2003–2012).

His research focused on galaxy formation in its most active phase at the early universe, using analytic models and computer simulations. He studied how continuous streams of cold gas and merging galaxies from the cosmic web lead to star-forming disks and drive violent gravitational disk instability, and how this instability leads to the formation of compact spheroidal galactic components with central massive black holes. His later work focused on the formation of the first galaxies as observed by the James Webb Space Telescope, proposing a unique phase of feedback-free starbursts (FFB) in the early Universe.

Dekel is the most highly cited astrophysicist in Israel, with 60,000 citations and H-index 120.

Dekel died on November 17, 2025, at the age of 74.
