= FRW/CFT duality =

Duality between FRW models and conformal field theory

In physics, the Friedmann–Robertson–Walker/conformal field theory-duality or FRW/CFT duality is a conjectured duality for Friedmann–Robertson–Walker metric inspired by the AdS/CFT correspondence. It assumes that the cosmological constant is exactly zero, which is only the case for models with exact unbroken supersymmetry. Because the energy density does not approach zero as we approach spatial infinity, the metric is not asymptotically flat. This is not an asymptotically cold solution.

== Overview ==
In eternal inflation, our universe passes through a series of phase transitions with progressively lower cosmological constant. Our current phase has a cosmological constant of size $10^{-123}$, which is conjectured to be metastable in string theory. It is possible our universe might tunnel into a supersymmetric phase with an exactly zero cosmological constant. In fact, any particle in eternal inflation will eventually terminate in a phase with exactly zero or negative cosmological constant. The phases with negative cosmological constant will end in a Big Crunch. Stephen Shenker and Leonard Susskind called this the census taker's hat.

The conformal compactification of the terminal phase has a Penrose diagram shaped like a hat for future null infinity. A Euclidean Liouville quantum field theory is assumed to reside there. The null coordinate corresponds to the running of the renormalization group.

The terminal phase has an ever-expanding FRW metric in which the average energy density goes to zero.
