= Quenched approximation =

Neglecting the fermion determinant in lattice calculations

In lattice field theory, the quenched approximation is an approximation often used in lattice gauge theory in which the quantum loops of fermions in Feynman diagrams are neglected. Equivalently, the corresponding one-loop determinants are set to one. This approximation is often forced upon the physicists because the calculation with the Grassmann numbers is computationally very difficult in lattice gauge theory.

In particular, quenched QED is QED without dynamical electrons, and quenched QCD is QCD without dynamical quarks.

Recent calculations typically avoid the quenched approximation.

== See also ==
- Lattice QCD
