= Order operator =

Operator characterizing the phase of a system

In quantum field theory, an order operator or an order field is a quantum field version of Landau's order parameter whose expectation value characterizes phase transitions. There exists a dual version of it, the disorder operator or disorder field, whose expectation value characterizes a phase transition by indicating the prolific presence of defect or vortex lines in an ordered phase.

The disorder operator is an operator that creates a discontinuity of the ordinary order operators or a monodromy for their values. For example, a 't Hooft operator is a disorder operator. So is the Jordan–Wigner transformation. The concept of a disorder observable was first introduced in the context of 2D Ising spin lattices, where a phase transition between spin-aligned (magnetized) and disordered phases happens at some temperature.

== See also ==
- Operator (physics)

== Books ==
- Kleinert, Hagen, Gauge Fields in Condensed Matter, Vol. I, " SUPERFLOW AND VORTEX LINES", pp. 1–742, Vol. II, "STRESSES AND DEFECTS", pp. 743–1456, World Scientific (Singapore, 1989); Paperback ISBN 9971-5-0210-0 (also available online: Vol. I and Vol. II)
