= Wilson action =

Lattice gauge theory action

In lattice field theory, the Wilson action is a discrete formulation of the Yang–Mills action, forming the foundation of lattice gauge theory. Rather than using Lie algebra valued gauge fields as the fundamental parameters of the theory, group valued link fields are used instead, which correspond to the smallest Wilson lines on the lattice. In modern simulations of pure gauge theory, the action is usually modified by introducing higher order operators through Symanzik improvement, significantly reducing discretization errors. The action was introduced by Kenneth Wilson in his seminal 1974 paper, launching the study of lattice field theory.

== Links and plaquettes ==
Lattice gauge theory is formulated in terms of elements of the compact gauge group rather than in terms of the Lie algebra valued gauge fields $A_\mu(x) = A^a_\mu(x) T^a$, where $T^a$ are the group generators. The Wilson line, which describes parallel transport of Lie group elements through spacetime along a path $C$, is defined in terms of the gauge field by

$$W[x,y] = \mathcal P e^{i\int_C A_\mu dx^\mu},$$

where $\mathcal P$ is the path-ordering operator. Discretizing spacetime as a lattice with points indexed by a vector $n$, the gauge field take on values only at these points $A_\mu(n)$. To first order in lattice spacing $a$ the smallest possible Wilson lines, those between two adjacent points, are known as links

$$U_\mu(n) = W[n, n+\hat \mu]+\mathcal O(a),$$

where $\hat \mu$ is a unit vector in the $\mu$ direction. Since to first order the path ordering operator drops out, the link is related to the discretized gauge field by $U_\mu(n) =e^{iaA_\mu(n)}$. They are the fundamental gauge theory variables of lattice gauge theory, with the path integral measure (mathematics) over the links given by the Haar measure at each lattice point.

Working in some representation of the gauge group, links are matrix valued and orientated. Links of an opposite orientation are defined so that the product of the link from $n$ to $n+\hat \mu$ with the link in the opposite direction is equal to the identity, which in the case of $\text{SU}(N)$ gauge groups means that $U_{-\mu}(n) = U_\mu(n-\hat \mu)^\dagger$. Under a gauge transformation $\Omega(n)$, the link transforms the same way as the Wilson line

$$U_\mu(n) \rightarrow \Omega(n) U_\mu(n) \Omega(n+\hat \mu)^\dagger.$$

The smallest non-trivial loop of link fields on the lattice is known as a plaquette, formed from four links around a square in the $\mu$-$\nu$ plane

$$U_{\mu\nu}(n) = U_\mu(n)U_\nu(n+\hat \mu)U_\mu(n+\hat \nu)^\dagger U_\nu(n)^\dagger.$$

The trace of a plaquette is a gauge invariant quantity, analogous to the Wilson loop in the continuum. Using the BCH formula and the lattice gauge field expression for the link variable, the plaquette can be written to lowest order in lattice spacing in terms of the discretized field strength tensor

$$U_{\mu\nu}(n) = e^{ia^2 F_{\mu\nu}(n)+\mathcal O(a^3)}.$$

== Lattice gauge action ==
By rescaling the gauge field using the gauge coupling $g$ and working in a representation with index $\rho$, defined through $\text{tr}[T^aT^b] = \rho\delta^{ab}$, the Yang–Mills action in the continuum can be rewritten as

$$S = \frac{1}{2g^2\rho}\int d^4 x \ \text{tr}[F_{\mu\nu}F^{\mu\nu}],$$

where the field strength tensor is Lie algebra valued $F_{\mu\nu}= F^a_{\mu\nu}T^a$. Since the plaquettes relate the link variables to the discretized field strength tensor, this allows one to construct a lattice version of the Yang–Mills action using them. This is the Wilson action, given in terms of a sum over all plaquettes of one orientation on the lattice

$S = \frac{1}{g^2 \rho}\sum_{n}\sum_{\mu<\nu} \text{Re} \ \text{tr}[1-U_{\mu\nu}(n)].$

It reduces down to the discretized Yang–Mills action with lattice artifacts coming in at order $\mathcal O(a^2)$.

This action is far from unique. A lattice gauge action can be constructed from any discretized Wilson loop. As long as the loops are suitably averaged over orientations and translations in spacetime to give rise to the correct symmetries, the action will reduce back down to the continuum result. The advantage of using plaquettes is its simplicity and that the action lends itself well to improvement programs used to reduce lattice artifacts.

== Symanzik improvement ==
The Wilson action $\mathcal O(a^2)$ errors can be reduced through Symanzik improvement, whereby additional higher order operators are added to the action to cancel these lattice artifacts. There are many higher order operators that can be added to the Wilson action corresponding to various loops of links. For $\text{SU}(N)$ gauge theories, the Lüscher–Weisz action uses $2\times 1$ rectangles $U_{rt}$ and parallelograms $U_{pg}$ formed from links around a cube

$$S[U] = \frac{\beta}{N} \sum_{pl}\text{Re} \ \text{tr}(1-U_{\mu\nu}) + \frac{\beta_{rt}}{N}\sum_{rt}\text{Re} \ \text{tr}(1-U_{rt}) + \frac{\beta_{pg}}{N}\sum_{pg}\text{Re} \ \text{tr}(1-U_{pg}),$$

where $\beta = 2N/g^2$ is the inverse coupling constant and $\beta_{rt}$ and $\beta_{pg}$ are the coefficients which are tuned to minimize lattice artifacts.

The value of the two prefactors can be calculated either by using the action to simulate known results and tuning the parameters to minimize errors, or else by calculating them using tadpole improved perturbation theory. For the case of an $\text{SU}(3)$ gauge theory the latter method yields

$$\beta_{rt} = - \frac{\beta_{pl}}{20u_0^2}(1+0.4805\alpha_s), \ \ \ \ \ \ \ \ \beta_{pg} = - \frac{\beta}{u_0^2}0.03325\alpha_s,$$

where $u_0$ is the value of the mean link and $\alpha_s$ is the quantum chromodynamics fine-structure constant

$$u_0 = \big(\tfrac{1}{3}\text{Re} \ \text{tr}\langle U_{\mu\nu}\rangle\big)^{1/4}, \ \ \ \ \ \ \ \ \alpha_s = - \frac{\ln(\tfrac{1}{3}\text{Re} \ \text{tr}\langle U_{\mu\nu} \rangle)}{3.06839}.$$
