= CA-duality =

Conjecture in quantum gravity

In quantum gravity and quantum complexity theory, the complexity equals action duality (CA-duality) is the conjecture that the gravitational action of any semiclassical state with an asymptotically anti-de Sitter background corresponds to quantum computational complexity, and that black holes produce complexity at the fastest possible rate. In technical terms, the complexity of a quantum state on a spacelike slice of the conformal field theory dual is proportional to the action of the Wheeler–DeWitt patch (WDW patch) of that spacelike slice in the bulk. The WDW patch is the union of all possible spacelike slices of the bulk with the CFT slice as its boundary.

This conjecture has been tested against several anti-de Sitter black hole backgrounds with and without shock waves, and was found to pass all the tests. The action for the WDW patch of a wormhole grows linearly in time for an exponentially long period. Dually, quantum circuit complexity has also been shown to grow linearly for an exponentially long time
