= 't Hooft loop =

Magnetic loop operator dual to the Wilson loop

In quantum field theory, the 't Hooft loop is the magnetic analogue of the Wilson loop. When acting on a quantum state, spatial 't Hooft loop operators give rise to thin loops of magnetic flux associated with magnetic vortices. They can also be used to diagnose the phase of a pure gauge theory where they act as the disorder parameter for the Higgs phase. Consistency conditions between electric and magnetic charges limit the possible 't Hooft loops that exist in a theory, similarly to the way that the Dirac quantization condition limits the set of allowed magnetic monopoles. They were first introduced by Gerard 't Hooft in 1978 in the context of possible phases that gauge theories admit.

== Definition ==
There are a number of ways to define 't Hooft lines and loops. For timelike curves $C$ they are equivalent to the gauge configuration arising from the worldline traced out by a magnetic monopole. These are singular gauge field configurations on the line such that their spatial slice have a magnetic field whose form approaches that of a magnetic monopole

$$B^i \xrightarrow{r\rightarrow 0} \frac{x^i}{4\pi r^3}Q(x),$$

where in Yang–Mills theories $Q(x)$ is generally a Lie algebra valued object specifying the magnetic charge. 't Hooft lines can also be inserted in the path integral by requiring that the gauge field measure can only run over configurations whose magnetic fields take the above form.

More generally, the 't Hooft loop can be defined as the operator whose effect is equivalent to performing a modified gauge transformations $\Omega$ that is singular on the loop $C$ in such a way that any other loop $C'$ parametrized by $s \in [0,1]$ with a winding number $l$ around $C$ satisfies

$$\Omega(s=1) = e^{i2\pi l/N}\Omega(s=0).$$

These modified gauge transformations are not true gauge transformations as they do not leave the action invariant. For temporal loops they create the aforementioned field configurations while for spatial loops they instead create loops of color magnetic flux, referred to as center vortices. By constructing such gauge transformations, an explicit form for the 't Hooft loop can be derived by introducing the Yang–Mills conjugate momentum operator

$$\Pi^a_i(x) = -i \frac{\delta}{\delta A^a_i(x)}.$$

If the loop $C$ encloses a surface $\Sigma$, then an explicitly form of the 't Hooft loop operator is

$$T[C] = e^{i\int d^3 x A^a_i(\Sigma, x)\Pi^a_i(x)}.$$

Using Stokes' theorem this can be rewritten in a way which shows that it measures the electric flux through $\Sigma$, analogous to how the Wilson loop measures the magnetic flux through the enclosed surface.

There is a close relation between 't Hooft and Wilson loops where given a two loops $C$ and $C'$ that have linking number $l$, then the 't Hooft loop $T[C]$ and Wilson loop $W[C']$ satisfy

$$T[C]W[C'] = z^lW[C']T[C],$$

where $z$ is an element of the center of the gauge group. This relation can be taken as a defining feature of 't Hooft loops. The commutation properties between these two loop operators is often utilized in topological field theory where these operators form an algebra.

== Disorder operator ==
The 't Hooft loop is a disorder operator since it creates singularities in the gauge field, with their expectation value distinguishing the disordered phase of pure Yang–Mills theory from the ordered confining phase. Similarly to the Wilson loop, the expectation value of the 't Hooft loop can follow either the area law

$$\langle T[C]\rangle \sim e^{-a A[C]},$$

where $A[C]$ is the area enclosed by loop $C$ and $a$ is a constant, or it can follow the perimeter law

$$\langle T[C]\rangle \sim e^{-bL[C]},$$

where $L[C]$ is the length of the loop and $b$ is a constant.

On the basis of the commutation relation between the 't Hooft and Wilson loops, four phases can be identified for $\text{SU}(N)$ gauge theories that additionally contain scalars in representations invariant under the center $\mathbb Z_N$ symmetry. The four phases are

- Confinement: Wilson loops follow the area law while 't Hooft loops follow the perimeter law.
- Higgs phase: Wilson loops follow the perimeter law while 't Hooft loops follow the area law.
- Confinement together with a partially Higgsed phase: both follow the area law.
- Mixed phase: both follow the perimeter law.

In the third phase the gauge group is only partially broken down to a smaller non-abelian subgroup. The mixed phase requires the gauge bosons to be massless particles and does not occur for $\text{SU}(N)$ theories, but is similar to the Coulomb phase for abelian gauge theory.

Since 't Hooft operators are creation operators for center vortices, they play an important role in the center vortex scenario for confinement. In this model, it is these vortices that lead to the area law of the Wilson loop through the random fluctuations in the number of topologically linked vortices.

== Charge constraints ==
In the presence of both 't Hooft lines and Wilson lines, a theory requires consistency conditions similar to the Dirac quantization condition which arises when both electric and magnetic monopoles are present. For a gauge group $G = \tilde G/H$ where $\tilde G$ is the universal covering group with a Lie algebra $\mathfrak g$ and $H$ is a subgroup of the center, then the set of allowed Wilson lines is in one-to-one correspondence with the representations of $G$. This can be formulated more precisely by introducing the weights $\boldsymbol \mu$ of the Lie algebra, which span the weight lattice $\Lambda_w(\mathfrak g)$. Denoting $\Lambda^G_w \subset \Lambda_w$ as the lattice spanned by the weights associated with the algebra of $G$ rather than $\mathfrak g$, the Wilson lines are in one-to-one correspondence with the lattice points $\Lambda_w^G/W$ lattice where $W$ is the Weyl group.

The Lie algebra valued charge of the 't Hooft line can always be written in terms of the rank $r$ Cartan subalgebra $\boldsymbol H$ as $Q=\boldsymbol m \cdot \boldsymbol H$, where $\boldsymbol m$ is an $r$-dimensional charge vector. Due to Wilson lines, the 't Hooft charge must satisfy the generalized Dirac quantization condition $e^{i\boldsymbol m \cdot \boldsymbol H} = 1$, which must hold for all representations of the Lie algebra.

The generalized quantization condition is equivalent to the demand that $\boldsymbol m \cdot \boldsymbol \mu \in 2\pi \mathbb Z$ holds for all weight vectors. To get the set of vectors $\boldsymbol m$ that satisfy this condition, one must consider roots $\boldsymbol \alpha$ which are adjoint representation weight vectors. Co-roots, defined using roots by $\boldsymbol \alpha^\vee = 2\boldsymbol \alpha/\boldsymbol \alpha^2$, span the co-root lattice $\Lambda_{\text{co-root}}(\mathfrak g)$. These vectors have the useful property that $\boldsymbol \alpha^\vee \cdot \boldsymbol \mu \in \mathbb Z$ meaning that the only magnetic charges allowed for the 't Hooft lines are ones that are in the co-root lattice

$$\boldsymbol m \in 2\pi \Lambda_{\text{co-root}}(\mathfrak g).$$

This is sometimes written in terms of the Langlands dual algebra $\mathfrak g^\vee$ of $\mathfrak g$ with a weight lattice $\Lambda_{mw}$, in which case the 't Hooft lines are described by $\Lambda_{mw}/W$.

More general classes of dyonic line operators, with both electric and magnetic charges, can also be constructed. Sometimes called Wilson–'t Hooft line operators, they are defined by pairs of charges $(\lambda_e, \lambda_m) \in \Lambda_w \times \Lambda_{mw}$ up to the identification that for all $w \in W$ it holds that

$$(\lambda_e, \lambda_m) \sim (w\lambda_e, w \lambda_m).$$

Line operators play a role in indicating differences in gauge theories of the form $G = \tilde G/H$ that differ by the center subgroup $H$. Unless they are compactified, these theories do not differ in local physics and no amount of local experiments can deduce the exact gauge group of the theory. Despite this, the theories do differ in their global properties, such as having different sets of allowed line operators. For example, in $\text{SU}(N)$ gauge theories, Wilson loops are labelled by $\Lambda_w(\mathfrak g)$ while 't Hooft lines by $\Lambda_{\text{co-root}}(\mathfrak g)$. However in $\text{SU}(N)/\mathbb Z_N$ the lattices are reversed where now the Wilson lines are determined by $\Lambda_{\text{co-root}}$ while the 't Hooft lines are determined by $\Lambda_w$.

== See also ==
- Polyakov loop
