= Higgs phase =

Phase in certain gauge theories

In theoretical physics, it is often important to consider gauge theory that admits many physical phenomena and "phases", connected by phase transitions, in which the vacuum may be found.

Global symmetries in a gauge theory may be broken by the Higgs mechanism. In more general theories such as those relevant in string theory, there are often many Higgs fields that transform in different representations of the gauge group.

If they transform in the adjoint representation or a similar representation, the original gauge symmetry is typically broken to a product of U(1) factors. Because U(1) describes electromagnetism including the Coulomb field, the corresponding phase is called a Coulomb phase.

If the Higgs fields that induce the spontaneous symmetry breaking transform in other representations, the Higgs mechanism often breaks the gauge group completely and no U(1) factors are left. In this case, the corresponding vacuum expectation values describe a Higgs phase.

Using the representation of a gauge theory in terms of a D-brane, for example D4-brane combined with D0-branes, the Coulomb phase describes D0-branes that have left the D4-branes and carry their own independent U(1) symmetries. The Higgs phase describes D0-branes dissolved in the D4-branes as instantons.
