= Lattice gauge theory =

Theory of quantum gauge fields on a lattice

In physics, lattice gauge theory is the study of gauge theories on a spacetime that has been discretized into a lattice.

Gauge theories are important in particle physics, and include the prevailing theories of elementary particles: quantum electrodynamics, quantum chromodynamics (QCD) and particle physics' Standard Model. Non-perturbative gauge theory calculations in continuous spacetime formally involve evaluating an infinite-dimensional path integral, which is computationally intractable. By working on a discrete spacetime, the path integral becomes finite-dimensional, and can be evaluated by stochastic simulation techniques such as the Monte Carlo method. When the size of the lattice is taken infinitely large and its sites infinitesimally close to each other, the continuum gauge theory is recovered.

== Basics ==
In lattice gauge theory, the spacetime is Wick rotated into Euclidean space and discretized into a lattice with sites separated by distance $a$ and connected by links. In the most commonly considered cases, such as lattice QCD, fermion fields are defined at lattice sites (which leads to fermion doubling), while the gauge fields are defined on the links. That is, an element U of the compact Lie group G (not algebra) is assigned to each link. Hence, to simulate QCD with Lie group SU(3), a 3×3 unitary matrix is defined on each link. The link is assigned an orientation, with the inverse element corresponding to the same link with the opposite orientation. And each node is given a value in $\mathbb{C}^3$ (a color 3-vector, the space on which the fundamental representation of SU(3) acts), a Dirac spinor, an n_{f} vector, and a Grassmann variable.

Thus, the composition of links' SU(3) elements along a path (i.e. the ordered multiplication of their matrices) approximates a path-ordered exponential (geometric integral), from which Wilson loop values can be calculated for closed paths.

== Yang–Mills action ==
The Yang–Mills action is written on the lattice using Wilson loops (named after Kenneth G. Wilson), so that the limit $a \to 0$ formally reproduces the original continuum action. Given a faithful irreducible representation ρ of G, the lattice Yang–Mills action, known as the Wilson action, is the sum over all lattice sites of the (real component of the) trace over the n links e_{1}, ..., e_{n} in the Wilson loop,

$$S=\sum_F -\Re\{\chi^{(\rho)}(U(e_1)\cdots U(e_n))\}.$$

Here, χ is the character. If ρ is a real (or pseudoreal) representation, taking the real component is redundant, because even if the orientation of a Wilson loop is flipped, its contribution to the action remains unchanged.

There are many possible Wilson actions, depending on which Wilson loops are used in the action. The simplest Wilson action uses only the 1×1 Wilson loop, and differs from the continuum action by "lattice artifacts" proportional to the small lattice spacing $a$. By using more complicated Wilson loops to construct "improved actions", lattice artifacts can be reduced to be proportional to $a^2$, making computations more accurate.

== Measurements and calculations ==
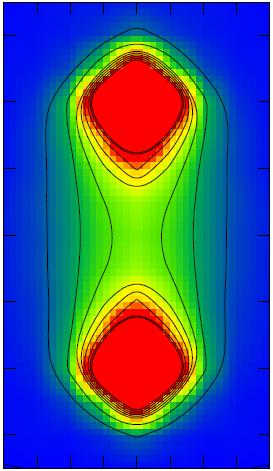
This result of a Lattice QCD computation shows a meson, composed out of a quark and an antiquark. (After M. Cardoso et al.)

Quantities such as particle masses are stochastically calculated using techniques such as the Monte Carlo method. Gauge field configurations are generated with probabilities proportional to $e^{-\beta S}$, where $S$ is the lattice action and $\beta$ is related to the lattice spacing $a$. The quantity of interest is calculated for each configuration, and averaged. Calculations are often repeated at different lattice spacings $a$ so that the result can be extrapolated to the continuum, $a \to 0$.

Such calculations are often extremely computationally intensive, and can require the use of the largest available supercomputers. To reduce the computational burden, the so-called quenched approximation can be used, in which the fermionic fields are treated as non-dynamic "frozen" variables. While this was common in early lattice QCD calculations, "dynamical" fermions are now standard. Simulating lattice gauge theories is one hypothetical application of quantum computers.

== Quantum triviality ==
Lattice gauge theory is also important for the study of quantum triviality by the real-space renormalization group. The most important information in the RG flow are the fixed points. The possible macroscopic states of the system, at a large scale, are given by this set of fixed points. If these fixed points correspond to a free field theory, the theory is said to be trivial or noninteracting.

The concept of triviality has been applied to the physics of the Higgs boson. A comparatively simple toy model of the "Higgs sector" of the Standard Model is provided by φ^{4} theory, i.e., a scalar field theory whose Lagrangian includes an interaction term that is quartic in the field φ. It is conjectured, based on evidence including lattice gauge calculations, that this theory is "trivial": if the regularization cutoff is taken to zero distance or infinite energy, the theory will describe only free particles. Using this as a model for the Higgs boson, the conjectured triviality implies that the cutoff cannot be removed. Because there is an upper bound on how high the cutoff energy can be, there is an upper bound on the interaction strength, which ultimately implies an upper bound on the mass of the Higgs boson.

== Other applications ==
Originally, solvable two-dimensional lattice gauge theories had already been introduced in 1971 as models with interesting statistical properties by the theorist Franz Wegner, who worked in the field of phase transitions.

When only 1×1 Wilson loops appear in the action, lattice gauge theory can be shown to be exactly dual to spin foam models.

== See also ==
- Hamiltonian lattice gauge theory
- Lattice field theory
- Lattice QCD
- Wilson action
