= Twistor =

Twistor may refer to:

== Math and science ==
- Twistor correspondence
- Twistor memory
- Twistor space
- Twistor string theory
- Twistor theory

== Other uses ==
- Twistor (book), a 1989 novel by American writer John G. Cramer

== See also ==
- Twister (disambiguation)
