= Richard S. Ward =

British mathematical physicist

Richard Samuel Ward
- Born: 6 September 1951 (age 74)
- Education: Rhodes University (BSc, MSc); University of Oxford (DPhil)
- Known for: Ward construction Ward's conjecture Penrose–Ward correspondence Penrose–Ward transform
- Awards: Whitehead Prize (1989); Fellow of the Royal Society (2005)
- Scientific career
- Fields: Mathematical physics; Theoretical physics
- Institutions: University of Durham
- Doctoral advisor: Roger Penrose
- Doctoral students: Paul Sutcliffe
- Website: www.maths.dur.ac.uk/~dma0rsw/

Richard Samuel Ward FRS (born 6 September 1951) is a British mathematical physicist. He is a Professor of Mathematical & Theoretical Particle Physics at the University of Durham.

== Work ==
Ward earned his Ph.D. from the University of Oxford in 1977, under the supervision of Roger Penrose. He is most famous for his extension of Penrose's twistor theory to nonlinear cases, which he with Michael Atiyah used to describe instantons by vector bundles on the three-dimensional complex projective space. He has related interests in the theory of monopoles, topological solitons and skyrmions.

== Honors and awards ==
Ward was awarded the Whitehead Prize in 1989 for his work in mathematical physics. He was elected as a fellow of the Royal Society of London in 2005. His certificate of election reads:

Richard Ward is distinguished for pioneering and elegant research in mathematical physics. He adapted the twistor transform to the self-dual Yang-Mills (SDYM) equation, and with Atiyah constructed general multi-instanton solutions. His discovery of the toroidal BPS two-monopole was a breakthrough in soliton theory. He showed that virtually all known integrable equations arise from SDYM by dimensional and algebraic reductions, allowing a unified solution method. Ward's twistor transform of SDYM, applied to string theory, is leading to striking progress in quantum Yang-Mills theory.

== Bibliography ==
=== Books ===
- Twistor geometry and field theory (with Raymond O. Wells Jr), Cambridge University Press 1990
- Integrable systems: twistors, loop groups, and Riemann surfaces (with Nigel Hitchin, Graeme Segal), Oxford, Clarendon Press 1999

=== Selected academic works ===
- Ward, R.S. (1977), "On self-dual gauge fields", Physics Letters A, 61 (2): 81–82, Bibcode:1977PhLA...61...81W, doi:10.1016/0375-9601(77)90842-8, MR 0443823.
- Atiyah, M.F.; Ward, R.S. (1977), "Instantons and algebraic geometry", Communications in Mathematical Physics, 55 (2): 117–124, Bibcode:1977CMaPh..55..117A, doi:10.1007/BF01626514, S2CID 121880030.
- Ward, R.S.; Tabor, M. (1985), "Integrable and solvable systems, and relations among them", Philosophical Transactions of the Royal Society of London A, 315 (1533): 451–457, Bibcode:1985RSPTA.315..451W, doi:10.1098/rsta.1985.0051, S2CID 123659512.
