= Freddy Cachazo =

Venezuelan-born theoretical physicist

- Education: Harvard University (Ph.D., 2002); International Centre for Theoretical Physics (Diploma, 1997); Simón Bolívar University (B.S., 1996)
- Known for: BCFW recursion CSW rules Soft graviton theorem
- Awards: New Horizons Prize (2014); Herzberg Medal (2012); Rutherford Memorial Medal (2011)
- Scientific career
- Fields: Theoretical Physics
- Workplaces: Perimeter Institute for Theoretical Physics; Institute for Advanced Study
- Thesis: Dualities in Field Theory from Geometric Transitions in String Theory (2002)
- Doctoral advisor: Cumrun Vafa
- Website: pitp.ca/people/Freddy-Cachazo

Freddy Alexander Cachazo is a Venezuelan-born theoretical physicist who holds the Gluskin Sheff Freeman Dyson Chair in Theoretical Physics at the Perimeter Institute for Theoretical Physics in Waterloo, Ontario, Canada.

He is known for the contributions to quantum field theory through the study of scattering amplitudes, in particular in quantum chromodynamics, N = 4 supersymmetric Yang–Mills theory and quantum gravity. His contributions include BCFW recursion relations, the CSW vertex expansion and the amplituhedron. In 2014, Cachazo was awarded the New Horizons Prize for uncovering numerous structures underlying scattering amplitudes in gauge theories and gravity.

== Academic career ==
After graduating from Simón Bolívar University in 1996, Cachazo attended a year-long Postgraduate Diploma Programme at the International Centre for Theoretical Physics (ICTP) in Trieste, Italy. He was admitted in Harvard University, where he completed the Ph.D. under the supervision of Cumrun Vafa in 2002.

Cachazo was a post-doctoral member of the Institute for Advanced Study (IAS) in Princeton, New Jersey in 2002-05 and 2009-10. In 2005, he became a faculty member at the Perimeter Institute for Theoretical Physics in Waterloo, Ontario, Canada, as well as an Adjoint Faculty at the nearby University of Waterloo. He currently holds the Gluskin Sheff Freeman Dyson Chair in Theoretical Physics.

Cachazo's research concerns quantum field theory, the underlying theory describing fundamental interactions of particles and space-time itself. The research program is to understand their deep structure through the study of scattering amplitudes. Such understanding allows for both efficient computation of the probabilities of physical processes occurring and insights into the unknown structures of the gauge theories and gravity.

Together with Ruth Britto, Bo Feng and Edward Witten, he introduced the recursion relations for the computation of scattering amplitudes, which opened a new window for computations required at particle accelerators, such as the Large Hadron Collider. With Nima Arkani-Hamed and collaborators, he studied N = 4 supersymmetric Yang–Mills theory and showed how to compute amplitudes at any order in the perturbation theory. He co-discovered a new formalism unifying gauge theory and gravity in any space-time dimension, known as the Cachazo-He-Yuan formulation.

== Awards and honors ==
In 2009, he was awarded the Gribov Medal for an outstanding work by a young physicist from the European Physical Society. Two year later he won the Rutherford Medal, an equivalent prize awarded by the Royal Society of Canada. In 2012, Canadian Association of Physicists awarded Cachazo with the Herzberg Medal. Finally, he won the 2014 New Horizons Prize, which by many is regarded to be the most prestigious award for young theoretical physicists.

== Selected publications ==
- Britto, Ruth; Cachazo, Freddy; Feng, Bo; Witten, Edward (2005). "Direct proof of tree-level recursion relation in Yang-Mills theory". Phys. Rev. Lett. 94 181602. arXiv:hep-th/0501052. Bibcode:2005PhRvL..94r1602B. doi:10.1103/PhysRevLett.94.181602. PMID 15904356. S2CID 10180346.
- Britto, Ruth; Cachazo, Freddy; Feng, Bo (2005). "Generalized unitarity and one-loop amplitudes in N=4 super-Yang-Mills". Nucl. Phys. B725 (275–305): 275–305. arXiv:hep-th/0412103. Bibcode:2005NuPhB.725..275B. doi:10.1016/j.nuclphysb.2005.07.014. S2CID 11653681.
- Arkani-Hamed, Nima; Cachazo, Freddy; Kaplan, Jared (2010). "What is the Simplest Quantum Field Theory?". JHEP. 1009:016 (9): 16. arXiv:0808.1446. Bibcode:2010JHEP...09..016A. doi:10.1007/JHEP09(2010)016. S2CID 118407741.
- Cachazo, Freddy; Svrcek, Peter; Witten, Edward (2004). "MHV vertices and tree amplitudes in gauge theory". JHEP. 2004 (9): 006. arXiv:hep-th/0403047. Bibcode:2004JHEP...09..006C. doi:10.1088/1126-6708/2004/09/006. S2CID 16328643.
- Arkani-Hamed, Nima; Bourjaily, Jacob L.; Cachazo, Freddy; Caron-Huot, Simon (2011). "The All-Loop Integrand For Scattering Amplitudes in Planar N=4 SYM". JHEP. 1101 (41): 41. arXiv:1008.2958. Bibcode:2011JHEP...01..041A. doi:10.1007/JHEP01(2011)041. S2CID 8746937.
- Arkani-Hamed, Nima; Bourjaily, Jacob L.; Cachazo, Freddy; Goncharov, Alexander B.; Postnikov, Alexander; Trnka, Jaroslav (2012). "Scattering Amplitudes and the Positive Grassmannian". arXiv:1212.5605 [hep-th].
- Arkani-Hamed, Nima; Cachazo, Freddy; Cheung, Clifford; Kaplan, Jared (2010). "A Duality For The S Matrix". JHEP. 1003:020 (3): 20. arXiv:0907.5418. Bibcode:2010JHEP...03..020A. doi:10.1007/JHEP03(2010)020. S2CID 5771375.
- Cachazo, Freddy; He, Song; Yuan, Ellis Ye (2014). "Scattering of Massless Particles in Arbitrary Dimensions". Phys. Rev. Lett. 113 171601. arXiv:1307.2199. Bibcode:2014PhRvL.113q1601C. doi:10.1103/PhysRevLett.113.171601. PMID 25379910. S2CID 5970885.
- Cachazo, Freddy; Strominger, Andrew (2014). "Evidence for a New Soft Graviton Theorem". arXiv:1404.4091 [hep-th].
