= Twistor string theory =

Aspect of theoretical physics

Twistor string theory is an equivalence between N = 4 supersymmetric Yang–Mills theory and the perturbative topological B model string theory in twistor space.

It was initially proposed by Edward Witten in 2003.

Twistor theory was introduced by Roger Penrose from the 1960s as a new approach to the unification of quantum theory with gravity. Twistor space is a three-dimensional complex projective space in which physical quantities appear as certain structural deformations. Spacetime and the familiar physical fields emerge as consequences of this description. But twistor space is chiral (handed) with left- and right-handed objects treated differently. For example, the graviton for gravity and the gluon for the strong force are both right-handed.

During this period, Edward Witten was a leading developer of string theory. In 2003, he produced a paper showing how string theory may be introduced into twistor space to provide a full physical model incorporating both left- and right-handed fields together with their full interactions.

The most important contribution of twistor string theory has been in the calculation of particle-particle collision scattering amplitudes, which determine the probabilities of the possible scattering processes. Witten showed that they have a remarkably simple structure in twistor space; in particular amplitudes are supported on algebraic curves. This has allowed both better understanding of experimental observations in particle colliders and deep insights into the natures of different quantum field theories. These insights have in turn led to new insights in pure mathematics. Such topics include Grassmannian residue formulae, the amplituhedron and holomorphic linking.

== See also ==
- BCFW recursion
- MHV amplitudes
