= Bondi–Metzner–Sachs group =

Asymptotic symmetry group of General Relativity

In general relativity, the Bondi–Metzner–Sachs (BMS) group, or the Bondi–Van der Burg–Metzner–Sachs group, is an asymptotic symmetry group of asymptotically flat, Lorentzian spacetimes at null (i.e., light-like) infinity. It was originally formulated in 1962 by Hermann Bondi, M. G. Van der Burg, A. W. Metzner and Rainer K. Sachs in order to investigate the flow of energy at infinity due to propagating gravitational waves. Instead of the expected ordinary four spacetime translations of special relativity associated with the well-known conservation of momentum and energy, they found, much to their puzzling surprise, a novel infinite superset of direction-dependent time translations, which were named supertranslations. Half a century later, this work of Bondi, Van der Burg, Metzner, and Sachs is considered pioneering and seminal. In his autobiography, Bondi considered the 1962 work as his "best scientific work". The group of supertranslations is key to understanding the connections to quantum fields and gravitational wave memories.

== Original work ==
To give some context for the general reader, the naive expectation for asymptotically flat spacetime symmetries, i.e., symmetries of spacetime seen by observers located far away from all sources of the gravitational field, would be to extend and reproduce the symmetries of flat spacetime of special relativity, viz., the Poincaré group, also called the inhomogeneous Lorentz group, which is a ten-dimensional group of three Lorentz boosts, three rotations, and four spacetime translations. In short, expectation was that in the limit of weak fields and long distances, general relativity would reduce to special relativity.

Expectations aside, the first step in the work of Bondi, Van der Burg, Metzner, and Sachs was to decide on some physically sensible boundary conditions to place on the gravitational field at light-like infinity to characterize what it means to say a metric is asymptotically flat, with no a priori assumptions made about the nature of the asymptotic symmetry group — not even the assumption that such a group exists. Then after artfully designing what they considered to be the most sensible boundary conditions, they investigated the nature of the resulting asymptotic symmetry transformations that leave invariant the form of the boundary conditions appropriate for asymptotically flat gravitational fields. What they found was that the asymptotic symmetry transformations actually do form a group and the structure of this group does not depend on the particular gravitational field that happens to be present. This means that, as expected, one can separate the kinematics of spacetime from the dynamics of the gravitational field at least at spatial infinity. The puzzling surprise in 1962 was their discovery of a rich infinite-dimensional group (the so-called BMS group) as the asymptotic symmetry group, instead of the expected ten-dimensional Poincaré group. The asymptotic symmetries include not only the six Lorentz boost/rotations but also an additional infinity of symmetries that are not Lorentz. These additional non-Lorentz asymptotic symmetries, which constitute an infinite superset of the four spacetime translations, are named supertranslations. This implies that General Relativity (GR) does not reduce to special relativity in the case of weak fields at long distances.

The coordinates used in the 1962 formulation were those introduced by Bondi and generalized by Sachs, which focused on null (i.e., light-like) geodesics, called null rays, along which the gravitational waves traveled. The null rays form a null hypersurface, defined by the retarded time $u = \text{constant}$ for outgoing waves and advanced time $v = \text{constant}$ for incoming waves. The basic idea, which was novel then, was to use the family of outgoing (or incoming) null hypersurfaces to build spacetime coordinates that would describe outgoing (or incoming) gravitational waves. In addition to the retarded (or advanced) time are the space-like distance $r$ and the null-ray direction $(\theta,\varphi)$ to complete the local spacetime coordinates $(u,r,\theta,\varphi)$. As $r$ is large and approaches infinity, the set of $u = \text{constant}$ null hypersurfaces form the future null infinity, where the outgoing gravitational waves "exit". Similar considerations of $v = \text{constant}$ null hypersurfaces as $r$ goes to infinity yield the past null infinity, where the incoming gravitational waves "enter". These two null (i.e., light-like) infinities, found using the non-inertial Bondi-Sachs coordinates, are not obvious in the inertial Cartesian coordinates of flat spacetime, where the two time-like infinities and the space-like infinity are obvious. All five infinities are revealed in the asymptotic conformal treatment of infinity by Penrose, where the future (or past) null infinity is denoted by script $I^+$ (or script $I^-$) and pronounced "scr-EYE plus" (or "scr-EYE minus").

The main surprise found in 1962 was that at the future null infinity, "$u$-translations" of the retarded time $u$ to $u + \alpha(\theta,\varphi)$ at any given direction $(\theta,\varphi)$ are asymptotic symmetry transformations, which were named supertranslations. As $\alpha(\theta,\varphi)$ can be expanded as an infinite series of spherical harmonics, it was shown that the first four terms (ℓ = 0, 1) reproduce the four ordinary spacetime translations, which form a subgroup of the supertranslations. In other words, supertranslations are direction-dependent time translations on the boundary of asymptotically flat spacetimes and include the ordinary spacetime translations. Loosely speaking, "neighboring" points on the future null infinity with slightly different $(\theta,\varphi)$ coordinates are actually very "far apart" in space such that they are not causally connected. Light rays from one point can't reach another, clocks can not be synchronized, and thus an arbitrary time offset $\alpha(\theta,\varphi)$ can be added to the clocks in each $(\theta,\varphi)$ direction, viz., a supertranslation. In fact, for any point on the future null infinity with a given $(\theta,\varphi)$, the only other points on the future null infinity that it is causally connected to are points with the same $(\theta,\varphi)$ coordinates with different $u$ coordinates.

Abstractly, the BMS group is an infinite-dimensional extension, or a superset, of the Poincaré group, in which four of the ten conserved quantities or charges of the Poincaré group (namely, the total energy and momentum associated with spacetime translations) are extended to include an infinite number of conserved supermomentum charges associated with spacetime supertranslations, while the six conserved Lorentz charges remain unchanged. The BMS group also has a similar structure as the Poincaré group: just as the Poincaré group is a semidirect product between the Lorentz group and the four-dimensional Abelian group of spacetime translations, the BMS group is a semidirect product of the Lorentz group with an infinite-dimensional Abelian group of spacetime supertranslations. The translation group is a normal subgroup of the supertranslation group. This structure turns the BMS group into an infinite-dimensional Lie group.

== Asymptotic symmetries interpreted and clarified ==
After half a century lull, interest in the study of this asymptotic symmetry group of general relativity (GR) surged, in part due to the advent of gravitational-wave astronomy (the hope of which prompted the pioneering 1962 studies). Interestingly, the extension of ordinary four spacetime translations to infinite-dimensional supertranslations, viewed in 1962 with consternation, is interpreted, half a century later, to be a key feature of the original BMS symmetry.

For example, by imposing supertranslation invariance (using a smaller BMS group acting only on the future or past null infinity) on S-matrix elements involving gravitons, the resulting Ward identities turn out to be equivalent to Steven Weinberg's 1965 soft graviton theorem. In fact, such a relation between asymptotic symmetries and soft quantum field theory theorems is not specific to gravitation alone, but is rather a general property of gauge theories including electromagnetism.

Furthermore, a gravitational memory effect, named displacement memory effect, can be associated with a BMS supertranslation. When a gravitating radiation pulse transits past arrays of detectors stationed near future null infinity in the vacuum, the relative positions and clock times of the detectors before and after the radiation transit differ by a BMS supertranslation. The relative spatial displacement found for a pair of nearby detectors reproduces the well-known and potentially measurable gravitational memory effect. Hence the displacement memory effect both physically manifests and directly measures the action of a BMS supertranslation.

BMS supertranslations, the leading soft graviton theorem, and displacement memory effect form the three vertices of an infrared triangle describing the leading infrared structure of asymptotically flat spacetimes at null infinity.

In addition, BMS supertranslations have been utilized to motivate the microscopic origin of black hole entropy, and that black hole formed by different initial star configurations would have different supertranslation hair.

Although the problems of defining angular momentum in general relativity were noted by Penrose in 1964, it wasn't until 2020 that novel supertranslational-invariant definitions of angular momentum began to appear in the literature. These new definitions, proposed independently by different researchers, contained some inconsistencies and revealed further ambiguities, viz., the first two harmonics of the so-called electric shear seemed redundant and open to choice. In 2024 Javadinezhad and Porrati showed that these puzzling ambiguities in the first two electric shear harmonics can be used to specify the origin of the spacetime coordinate in the center of mass frame in which a proper unambiguous supertranslational-invariant definition of angular momentum for asymptotically flat spacetimes in general relativity can be explicitly formulated.

== Asymptotic symmetries extended ==
Whether the GR asymptotic symmetry group should be larger or smaller than the original BMS group is a subject of research, since various and differing extensions have been proposed in the literature. Most notable is the so-called extended BMS group where the six-dimensional Lorentz group is also extended into an infinite-dimensional group of so-called superrotations. Just like displacement memory effect is associated with a BMS supertranslation, a new gravitational memory effect, named spin memory effect, can be associated with a superrotation of the extended BMS group. But unlike displacement memory, which can represent a shift to a supertranslated time frame, spin memory does not correspond to a spacetime merely superrotated from an early frame.

To sort out which GR asymptotic symmetry might represent the Universe, recent simulations suggest that determining which gravitational-wave (GW) memory terms, displacement and spin, would give the best fit to the GW data to be collected in next generation detectors might constrain the three model symmetry scenarios: (a) Poincaré group (no memory); (b) original BMS group (only displacement memory); and (c) extended BMS group (both displacement and spin memories).

== Asymptotic symmetries of the dual field ==
In $D > 4$ the graviton admits dual descriptions through mixed-symmetry fields of the hook type associated to Young diagrams $(D-3,1)$; the simplest case is the $(2,1)$ hook field, also known as Curtrigth Field, that is dual to the graviton in $D=5$. Gauge theories with mixed symmetry tensors gauge field are much more difficult to treat than standard gauge theories. The difficulty is not only due to a more complicated tensor algebra but also to conceptual issues related to gauge-for-gauge redundancy. These are transformations of the gauge parameters that leave the field configurations invariant. Furthermore, gauge theories with mixed-symmetry fields can have multiple gauge parameters at each gauge-for-gauge level. For a hook field $(D-3,1)$, there are two gauge parameters: a hook $(D-4,1)$ and a $D-3$ form. A useful language for dealing with mixed-symmetry fields is that of differential multiforms, which allows us to extend de Rham cohomology by providing a mathematical framework for the systematic study of mixed-symmetry fields.

The asymptotic symmetries and charges of the graviton field in dimension rather than four can be studied through the dual formulation: the calculation is performed in the gauge theory of the mixed-symmetry field, obtaining the asymptotic charges, and through duality, information on the graviton charges is obtained. The computation of the asymptotic charges for the Curtrigth Field was accomplished using a de Donder gauge together with an on-shell zero trace condition in 2026 by Manzoni showing that the dual algebra closes in a BMS-like algebra hosting a higher-spin-supertranslation sector.
