= Graham Farmelo =

Biographer and science writer (born 1953)

Graham Paul Farmelo (born 18 May 1953) is a biographer and science writer, a Fellow at Churchill College, University of Cambridge, U.K., and an adjunct professor of Physics at Northeastern University, Boston, U.S.A. He is best known for his work on science communication and as the author of biographies such as The Strangest Man of the theoretical physicist Paul Dirac.

== Education and early career in science ==
Farmelo was born in London and raised in Orpington, Kent. He went to Cray Valley School, Sidcup, where he worked on a project that led to his first published paper, in biomedical engineering. At the University of Liverpool he took a BSc in mathematical physics (1974) and then a PhD in theoretical particle physics (1977). Directly afterwards, he was appointed as a lecturer in physics at the Open University. He worked there until 1990, writing texts and making television programmes on various course teams, chairing the production of the University’s Science Foundation Course (1986–1989). His research was in the field of particle physics (hadronic interactions) and chaos (scattering theory).

== Writing ==
Farmelo's first book, It Must be Beautiful: Great Equations of Modern Science (2002), was a collection of essays. Contributors included Peter Galison, Robert May, Oliver Morton, Roger Penrose, Christine Sutton, Steven Weinberg and Frank Wilczek.

Farmelo's Dirac biography The Strangest Man won the 2009 Costa Prize for Biography and the 2009 'Los Angeles Times Science and Technology Book Prize'. The book was chosen by Physics World as the physics book of the year in 2009, when it was selected as one of Nature’s books of the year. Much of the book was written while Farmelo was a Director’s visitor at the Institute for Advanced Study, Princeton.

Farmelo's 2013 book 'Churchill's Bomb' focuses on Winston Churchill's role in British nuclear research 1939-53, with hitherto unpublished information on its influence by Churchill's science adviser Frederick Lindemann. The book emphasizes conflicts between scientific opportunity and political or managerial direction, featuring Rudolf Peierls, Niels Bohr, James Chadwick, John Cockcroft, Otto Frisch, Vannevar Bush and Robert Oppenheimer. Nuclear research was unique in being the last topic added to the pool of American and British research 1941-45 and the first removed from that pool in 1943. Farmelo is critical of Churchill's wavering attention and changes of policy as he aged.

Farmelo authored The Universe Speaks in Numbers, published in May 2019. It explores the relationship between mathematics and the search for the laws of physics, and highlights the contributions of several theoretical physicists, natural philosophers and mathematicians, notably Isaac Newton, Pierre-Simon Laplace, James Clerk Maxwell, Albert Einstein and Paul Dirac, before focussing on key developments on the mathematics-physics interface from the 1970s. Among the physicists and mathematicians whose work Farmelo discusses are Nima Arkani-Hamed, Michael Atiyah, Simon Donaldson, Michael Green, Stephen Parke, John Henry Schwarz, Nathan Seiberg, Tomasz Taylor, Gabriele Veneziano, Edward Witten and Chen-Ning Yang.

Farmelo's 2026 biography 'Hawking: His life and work' was authorized by Stephen Hawking's estate. It was reviewed in the Times Literary Supplement October 16, 2026 by Charles Seife. Other reviews were in The Guardian and in Science

Farmelo has also co-edited several inter-disciplinary collections of essays on museums and science centres, notably ‘Creating Connections – museums and the public understanding of current research’, ‘Here and Now – contemporary science and technology in museums and science centres’ and ‘Museum visitor studies in the 90s’ These books resulted from international conferences that he co-directed in the U.K and the U.S.A.

His journalism includes articles for New Scientist, Scientific American and several national newspapers in the U.K, book reviews in a wide range of publications, notably The Times, The New York Times, The Guardian, Nature and Times Higher Education.

== Science communication ==
Farmelo was a senior executive at the Science Museum, London, from 1990–2003. He was responsible for a variety of initiatives, mostly concerning the presentation of contemporary science and technology in events and exhibitions, notably the planning and delivery of the Wellcome Wing and the Dana Centre.

He has lectured on Paul Dirac and on science communication all over the world and often appeared on BBC radio and television in the U.K., mainly in features on modern physics and science policy.

Farmelo has often given talks that feature the participation of an actor playing the protagonist, for example Leó Szilárd in 'Dawn of the Nuclear Age', Edinburgh Science Festival, 1993; Michael Faraday in lecture at the annual meeting of the British Association for the Advancement of Science in 1994, and Paul Dirac in 'The Religion of Mathematical Beauty', Stirling Lecture, University of Durham, 2010.

Farmelo is now a consultant in science communication, specializing in museums and science centres, and in the strategic management of science-related organisations. Since 2003, he has done work in this field in the U.K, the U.S., Ireland, Saudi Arabia, South Korea and Japan.

== Recognition ==
Farmelo was awarded the Kelvin Prize and Medal in 2012 by the Institute of Physics, which elected him a Fellow in 1998.

In 2011 he was appointed an Honorary Fellow of the British Science Association.
