= Lydia Bieri =

Swiss-American mathematician, physicist, and historian of science (b. 1972)

- Born: 1972 (age 53–54); Sempach, Switzerland
- Citizenship: Swiss and American
- Education: ETH Zurich
- Awards: NSF Career Award (2013); Simmons Fellow in Mathematics (2018); Fellow of the American Physical Society (2021)
- Scientific career
- Fields: Applied mathematics; Theoretical physics; History of science
- Workplaces: Harvard University; University of Michigan
- Thesis: An Extension of the Stability Theorem of the Minkowski Space in General Relativity (2007)
- Doctoral advisor: Demetrios Christodoulou; Michael Struwe

Lydia Rosina Bieri (born 1972) is a Swiss-American applied mathematician, mathematical physicist, and historian of science who studies general relativity, gravitational waves, and gravitational memory effects. She is a professor of mathematics and director of the Michigan Center for Applied and Interdisciplinary Mathematics at the University of Michigan.

== Education and career ==
Bieri is originally from Sempach, in Switzerland. She studied mathematics at the ETH Zurich, earning a diploma (the equivalent of a master's degree) in 2001. She completed a doctorate (Dr. sc.) at the same institution in 2007, with the support of a Swiss National Funds Fellowship. Her dissertation, An Extension of the Stability Theorem of the Minkowski Space in General Relativity, was supervised by Demetrios Christodoulou, and jointly promoted by Michael Struwe.

After postdoctoral research as a Benjamin Peirce Fellow in mathematics at Harvard University from 2007 to 2010, Bieri became an assistant professor of mathematics at the University of Michigan in 2010. She became associate professor in 2015, director of the Michigan Center for Applied and Interdisciplinary Mathematics in 2019, and full professor in 2021.

== Books ==
With Harry Nussbaumer of ETH Zurich, Bieri is the coauthor of a general-audience book on cosmology and its history, Discovering the Expanding Universe (Cambridge University Press, 2009), She is also the coauthor of a research monograph with Nina Zipser, Extensions of the Stability Theorem of the Minkowski Space in General Relativity (AMS/IP Studies in Advanced Mathematics, American Mathematical Society, 2009).

== Recognition ==
Bieri won an NSF CAREER Award in 2013 and was named a Simons Fellow in Mathematics in 2018. She was named a Fellow of the American Physical Society (APS) in 2021, after a nomination from the APS Division of Gravitational Physics, "for fundamental results on the global existence of solutions of the Einstein field equations, and many contributions to the understanding of gravitational wave memory". She was named to the 2023 class of Fellows of the American Mathematical Society, "for contributions to mathematical general relativity and geometric analysis".
