= Raymond O. Wells Jr. =

American mathematician

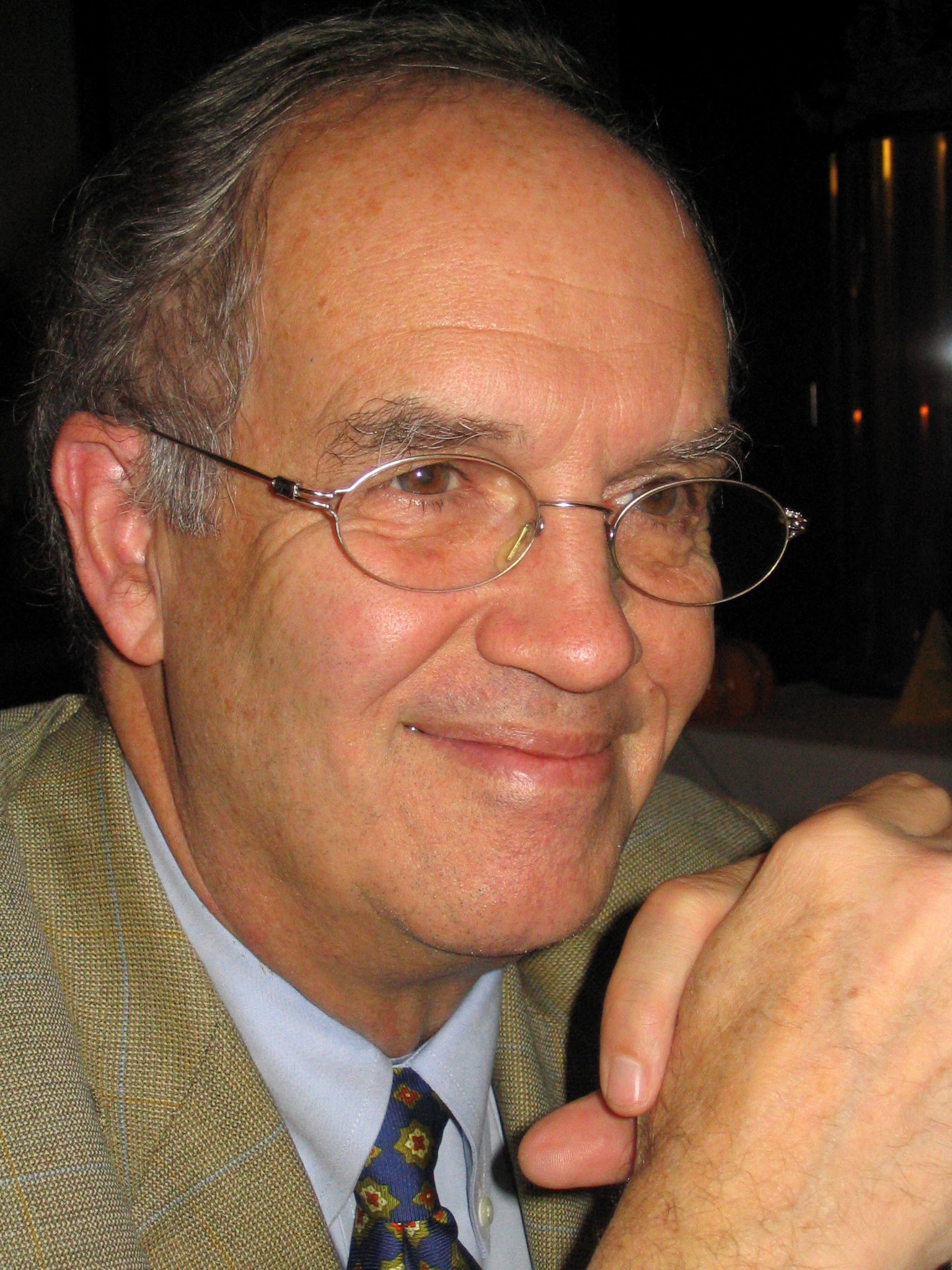
R. O. Wells Jr.

Raymond O'Neil Wells Jr. (born 1940), "Ronny", is an American mathematician, working in complex analysis in several variables as well as wavelets.

Wells received his BA from Rice University in 1962 and his Ph.D. in 1965 from New York University under the supervision of Lipman Bers (On the local holomorphic hull of a real submanifold in several complex variables). He was Professor of Mathematics at Rice University, where he served as chairman of the Department of Mathematics. After becoming Professor Emeritus from Rice, he co-founded the Jacobs University Bremen. He was Professor of Mathematics and Vice-President of External Affairs.

He has written books on twistors, wavelets, and analysis on complex manifolds.

In 1970–71 and 1979–80, he was at the Institute for Advanced Study in Princeton, New Jersey.

From 1974 to 1975 he was a Guggenheim Fellow and received the Humboldt Senior Scientist Award. He was editor of the Transactions of the American Mathematical Society. He is a fellow of the American Mathematical Society.

== Writings ==
- Differential and Complex Analysis: Origins, Abstractions and Embeddings, Springer 2017.
- Differential Analysis on Complex Manifolds, Prentice–Hall 1973, 2nd Ed. Springer Verlag 1980, 3rd Ed. 2008.
- With Howard L. Resnikoff Mathematics in Civilization, Holt, Rinehart and Winston 1973, 2nd Ed. Dover Publications 1984, 3rd Ed. Dover Publications 2015.
- Complex Geometry in Mathematical Physics, Presses de L'Université Montréal, 1982.
- With Howard L. Resnikoff, Wavelet Analysis – The Scalable Structure of Information, Springer Verlag 1998
- With Richard S. Ward, Twistor Geometry and Field Theory, Cambridge University Press 1990.
- Editor Several Complex Variables, two volumes, Symposium in Pure Mathematics, American Mathematical Society, 1977. Part 1
- With Joseph A. Wolf, Poincaré series and automorphic cohomology on flag manifolds, Annals of Mathematics 105 (1977), 397–448. doi:10.2307/1970918
- With Daniel M. Burns and Steven Shnider, Deformations of strictly pseudoconvex domains, Inventiones Mathematicae 46 (1978), 237–253. doi:10.1007/BF01390277
- Wells Jr, R. O. (1979). "Complex manifolds and mathematical physics". Bulletin of the American Mathematical Society. 1 (2): 296–336. doi:10.1090/S0273-0979-1979-14596-8. ISSN 0273-0979.
- With Michael G. Eastwood and Roger Penrose, Eastwood, Michael G.; Penrose, Roger; Wells, R. O. (1981). "Cohomology and massless fields". Communications in Mathematical Physics. 78 (3): 305–351. Bibcode:1981CMaPh..78..305E. doi:10.1007/BF01942327. ISSN 0010-3616. S2CID 121012779.
- Wells Jr, R. O. (1982). "The Cauchy-Riemann equations and differential geometry". Bulletin of the American Mathematical Society. 6 (2): 187–199. doi:10.1090/S0273-0979-1982-14976-X. ISSN 0273-0979.
