= The Strangest Man =

2009 biography by Graham Farmelo

- Author: Graham Farmelo
- Language: English
- Genre: Biography
- Publisher: Faber and Faber
- Publication date: 22 January 2009
- Publication place: United Kingdom
- Media type: Print
- Pages: 539
- ISBN: 978-0-571-22278-0

The Strangest Man: The Hidden Life of Paul Dirac, Quantum Genius is a 2009 biography of quantum physicist Paul Dirac written by British physicist and author, Graham Farmelo, and published by Faber and Faber. The book won the Biography Award at the 2009 Costa Book Awards, and the 2009 Los Angeles Times Book Prize for Science and Technology.

The title is based on a comment by physicist Niels Bohr four years before his death that of all the scientists who had visited his institute, Dirac was "the strangest man".

== Overview ==
Farmelo charts Dirac's life from his upbringing in early 20th-century Bristol, through his years in Cambridge, Göttingen and Princeton up until his death in 1984, and that of his wife 18 years later.

Throughout the book, Dirac's work and his unusual personality is explored, with his reservedness, apparent lack of empathy, and relentless literal-mindedness leading way to several humorous anecdotes. For example, when approached by two graduate students, while on a brief visit to Berkeley, Dirac sat through a brief presentation about their work on quantum field theory, bracing themselves for his perceptive comments, there was a long silence, after which Dirac asked them "Where is the post office?" Offering to take him there, the students suggested that he could give them his thoughts on their presentation, to which Dirac replied, "I can't do two things at once."

The book is divided into thirty-one chapters, each beginning with a short epigraph and covering a set time period, for example, chapter Twenty-one is entitled "January 1936-Summer 1939", and begins with a short quote by Paul Carus. The final two chapters break from the dating style, in order to discuss "Dirac's Brain and Persona" and his "Legacy". The book has a comprehensive set of notes, index, and six pages of black and white photographs. In the final chapter, Farmelo presents arguments that Dirac may have been autistic and that this partially explains Dirac's well-known personality eccentricities.

The book was published in the United States under a slightly different title: The Strangest Man: The Hidden Life of Paul Dirac, Mystic of the Atom.

== Reviews ==
Online literary magazine Bookhugger.co.uk labeled the book as "a moving human story, and a study of one of the most exciting times in scientific history." The magazine placed the book in their "Best of 2009" list as well. Playwright Michael Frayn, author of Copenhagen, remarked that "this was the biography Farmelo was born to write".

Physicist Freeman Dyson wrote a mostly-positive review in The New York Review of Books, though he argued based on his personal acquaintance with Dirac that Dirac was not autistic according to the definition of autism being used in that era. He says Dirac may have been autistic under newer and wider definitions, and that it might be possible to settle this question by DNA analysis someday, provided that a usable sample of Dirac's DNA has been preserved. Jochen Heisenberg, also a physicist and a son of Dirac's contemporary Werner Heisenberg, responded to Dyson's review in support of Dyson's questioning Farmelo's assessment of Dirac's possible autism, and particularly appreciating Dyson's rendering of Dirac's assessment of Werner Heisenberg. Dirac's response to critics of his continued support of Werner Heisenberg (who worked on the German nuclear weapons program during World War 2) was "It is easy to be a hero in a democracy".

Physicist Jocelyn Bell Burnell wrote in the Times Higher Education Supplement: "As well as being clear without being condescending, Farmelo's style is accessible and entertaining. His style of writing is sparkling, racy and has panache. He is entertaining and has a wry sense of humour, so the book will appeal to a very wide readership. Indeed, if it were a month earlier I would be recommending it as a Christmas present for senior school students and undergraduates with an interest in physics, history of science students and their teachers, and members of the public with these interests."

== See also ==
- American Prometheus: The Triumph and Tragedy of J. Robert Oppenheimer
- The Principles of Quantum Mechanics
