= James Broadhurst =

New Zealand rugby union player

- Born: James Patrick Broadhurst; 1 December 1987 (age 38) Kaitaia, New Zealand
- Height: 2.01 m (6 ft 7 in)
- Weight: 122 kg (19 st 3 lb)
- Notable relative: Michael Broadhurst (brother)

Rugby union career
- Position: Lock
Senior career
| Years | Team | Apps | (Points) |
| 2007–2009 | Canterbury | 20 | (0) |
| 2010–2017 | Hurricanes | 71 | (10) |
| 2010–2017 | Taranaki | 54 | (25) |
- Correct as of 21 June 2018
International career
| Years | Team | Apps | (Points) |
| 2007 | New Zealand U21 | 1 | (0) |
| 2015 | New Zealand | 1 | (0) |
- Correct as of 26 July 2015

James Broadhurst (born 1 December 1987) is a former New Zealand rugby union lock who played provincial rugby for Taranaki, Super Rugby for the Hurricanes, and for the All Blacks. He was also a national representative at the under-19 and under-21 levels.

Broadhurst was born in Kaitaia and educated at Campion College in Gisborne.

Broadhurst made his debut for New Zealand on 25 July 2015 against South Africa but was subbed off at half-time. In September that year Broadhurst received two serious head knocks while representing Taranaki and was taken off the field due to concussion. Broadhurst has not played a game of rugby since then, with symptoms of concussion still ongoing for him as of early 2017.

His brother is Japan rugby player Michael Broadhurst.

He retired in April 2017 after failing to recover from the ongoing effects of concussion.
