= Demetrios Christodoulou =

Greek mathematician and physicist (born 1951)

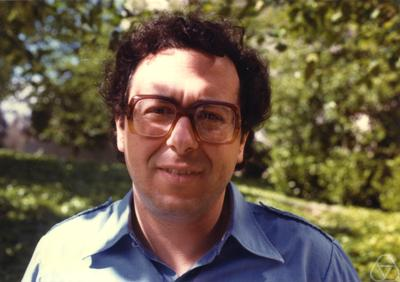
- Christodoulou in 1982
- Born: 19 October 1951 (age 74); Athens, Greece
- Citizenship: Greece; United States
- Education: Princeton University
- Known for: stability of Minkowski space; gravitational memory effect; naked singularities; formation of black holes; formation of shock waves
- Awards: Otto Hahn Medal (1981); MacArthur Fellows Award (1993); Bôcher Memorial Prize (1999); Member of American Academy of Arts and Sciences (2001); Tomalla Foundation Prize (2008); Shaw Prize (2011); Member of US National Academy of Sciences (2012); Marcel Grossmann Award (2021); Henri Poincaré Prize (2021)
- Scientific career
- Fields: Mathematics; physics
- Workplaces: University of Athens; Princeton University; Caltech; CERN; Syracuse University; Courant Institute; ETH Zurich; University of Crete
- Doctoral advisor: John Archibald Wheeler
- Doctoral students: Lydia Bieri; Mihalis Dafermos; Gilbert Weinstein

Demetrios Christodoulou (Greek: Δημήτριος Χριστοδούλου; born 19 October 1951) is a Greek mathematician and physicist, who became well known for his proof, together with Sergiu Klainerman, of the nonlinear stability of the Minkowski spacetime of special relativity in the framework of general relativity. Christodoulou is a 1993 MacArthur Fellow.

== Early life ==
Christodoulou was born in Athens and received his doctorate in physics from Princeton University in 1971 under the direction of John Archibald Wheeler. After a temporary position at Caltech, a full professor position at the physics department of the University of Athens shortly followed at the age of 21. He visited CERN and the Max Planck Institute for Physics. His also was given an indefinite paid leave to Paris to study mathematics and to Courant. He became professor of mathematics, first at Syracuse University, then at the Courant Institute, and at Princeton University, before taking up his last position as professor of mathematics and physics at the ETH Zurich in Switzerland. He is emeritus professor since January 2017 and an honorary professor of the departments of mathematics and physics at the University of Crete and Brown. He holds dual Greek and U.S. citizenship.

== Achievements ==
In 1993, he published a book coauthored with Klainerman in which their proof of the stability result is laid out in detail. In that year, he was named a MacArthur Fellow. In 1991, he published a paper which shows that the test masses of a gravitational wave detector suffer permanent relative displacements after the passage of a gravitational wave train, an effect which has been named "nonlinear memory effect". In the period 1987–1999 he published a series of papers on the gravitational collapse of a spherically symmetric self-gravitating scalar field and the formation of black holes and associated spacetime singularities. He also showed that, contrary to what had been expected, singularities which are not hidden in a black hole also occur. However, he then showed that such "naked singularities" are unstable. In 2000, Christodoulou published a book on general systems of partial differential equations deriving from a variational principle (or "action principle"). In 2007, he published a book on the formation of shock waves in 3-dimensional fluids. In 2009 he published a book where a result which complements the stability result is proved. Namely, that a sufficiently strong flux of incoming gravitational waves leads to the formation of a black hole. In 2019 he published a book which addresses the development of shocks past the point of formation by studying a free boundary problem with singular initial conditions.

== Awards ==
Christodoulou is a recipient of the Bôcher Memorial Prize, a prestigious award of the American Mathematical Society. The Bôcher Prize citation mentions his work on the spherically symmetric scalar field as well as his work on the stability of Minkowski spacetime. In 2008, he was awarded the Tomalla prize in gravitation. In 2011, he and Richard S. Hamilton won the Shaw Prize in the Mathematical Sciences, "for their highly innovative works on nonlinear partial differential equations in Lorentzian and Riemannian geometry and their applications to general relativity and topology". The citation for Christodoulou mentions his work on the formation of black holes by gravitational waves as well as his earlier work on the spherically symmetric self-gravitating scalar field and his work with Klainerman on the stability of Minkowski spacetime. Christodoulou is a member of the American Academy of Arts and Sciences and of the U.S. National Academy of Sciences. In 2012, he became a fellow of the American Mathematical Society. In 2014 he was a plenary speaker at the ICM in Seoul. Since 2016, he is also a member of the Academia Europaea. In 2021, he was awarded the Henri Poincaré Prize.
