= Campion College, Gisborne =

School in Gisborne, New Zealand

Campion College

Location
- Campion Rd; Gisborne, New Zealand; 38.6485°S 177.9884°E

Information
- Type: Catholic State-Integrated Co-Educational Secondary School (Years 7–13)
- Motto: In Christ We Are Alive
- Established: 1974; 52 years ago
- Ministry of Education Institution no.: 211
- Principal: Paul McGuinness
- Enrolment: 478 (July 2026)
- Socio-economic decile: 6
- Website: www.campioncollege.school.nz

Campion College, Gisborne is a Catholic, State-integrated, co-educational college located in Gisborne, New Zealand, including students from Year 7 to Year 13. The college received its name from its patron saint, St Edmund Campion whose feast day is 1 December. Religious Education is provided for all classes.

== History ==
The origins of the school lie in two former single-sex colleges which operated in Gisborne: Saint Edmund Campion College, founded by the Marist Brothers for boys, and St Mary's College, founded by the Sisters of St Joseph of the Sacred Heart for girls. In 1960, the Marist Brothers transferred the boys' school to the site presently occupied by Campion College.

In 1974, the boys' and girls' schools were merged into one on the site of Edmund Campion College. In 1976, the administration as a co-educational College from Year 9–13 was set in place and the name changed to Campion College. In 1982, Campion College entered the State education system as an integrated school when an integration agreement under the Private Schools Conditional Integration Act 1975 was signed by the school's proprietor and the Minister of Education. In 2005, following the addition of the Hato Maria block to the grounds of Campion, year 7 and 8 students from St Mary's Primary School joined the college. Campion now caters to students from years 7 to 13.

== Enrolment ==
As a state-integrated school, Campion College charges compulsory attendance dues. For the 2025 school year, the attendance dues payable are $516 per year for students in years 7 and 8, and $1,032 per year for students in year 9 and above.

As of July 2026, Campion College has a roll of 478 students, of which 134 (28.0%) identify as Māori.

As of 2026, the school has an Equity Index of 437, placing it amongst schools whose students have below average socioeconomic barriers to achievement (roughly equivalent to deciles 6 and 7 under the former socio-economic decile system).

== Sports ==
Although the college focuses mainly on academic pursuits, sports are an important aspect of college life. Campion specialises in sports such as volleyball, basketball, cricket, hockey, and football (soccer).

== Alumni ==
- James Broadhurst (born 1987) – former professional rugby union player; member of the All Blacks.
- Michael Broadhurst (born 1986) – professional rugby player for the Ricoh Black Rams in the Top League and the Japan national rugby union team.
- Stephen Parke (born 1950) – PhD (in Theoretical Particle Physics) (1980) (Harvard), physicist (Edmund Campion College).
- David Garrett (born 1957) – lawyer and former member of Parliament.
- Tayler Reid (born 1996) – triathlete; represented NZ at the 2018 Commonwealth Games on the Gold Coast.
