= History of loop quantum gravity =

Aspect of astrophysics history

The history of loop quantum gravity spans more than three decades of intense research.

== History ==
=== Classical theories of gravitation ===
General relativity is the theory of gravitation published by Albert Einstein in 1915. According to it, the force of gravity is a manifestation of the local geometry of spacetime. Mathematically, the theory is modelled after Bernhard Riemann's metric geometry, but the Lorentz group of spacetime symmetries (an essential ingredient of Einstein's own theory of special relativity) replaces the group of rotational symmetries of space. (Later, loop quantum gravity inherited this geometric interpretation of gravity, and posits that a quantum theory of gravity is fundamentally a quantum theory of spacetime.)

In the 1920s, the French mathematician Élie Cartan formulated Einstein's theory in the language of bundles and connections, a generalization of Riemannian geometry to which Cartan made important contributions. The so-called Einstein–Cartan theory of gravity not only reformulated but also generalized general relativity, and allowed spacetimes with torsion as well as curvature. In Cartan's geometry of bundles, the concept of parallel transport is more fundamental than that of distance, the centerpiece of Riemannian geometry. A similar conceptual shift occurs between the invariant interval of Einstein's general relativity and the parallel transport of Einstein–Cartan theory.

=== Spin networks ===
In 1971, physicist Roger Penrose explored the idea of space arising from a quantum combinatorial structure. His investigations resulted in the development of spin networks. Because this was a quantum theory of the rotational group and not the Lorentz group, Penrose went on to develop twistors.

=== Loop quantum gravity ===
In 1982, Amitabha Sen tried to formulate a Hamiltonian formulation of general relativity based on spinorial variables, where these variables are the left and right spinorial component equivalents of Einstein–Cartan connection of general relativity. Particularly, Sen discovered a new way to write down the two constraints of the ADM Hamiltonian formulation of general relativity in terms of these spinorial connections. In his form, the constraints are simply conditions that the spinorial Weyl curvature is trace free and symmetric. He also discovered the presence of new constraints which he suggested to be interpreted as the equivalent of Gauss constraint of Yang–Mills field theories. But Sen's work fell short of giving a full clear systematic theory and particularly failed to clearly discuss the conjugate momenta to the spinorial variables, its physical interpretation, and its relation to the metric (in his work he indicated this as some lambda variable).

In 1986–87, physicist Abhay Ashtekar completed the project which Amitabha Sen began. He clearly identified the fundamental conjugate variables of spinorial gravity: The configuration variable is as a spinoral connection (a rule for parallel transport; technically, a connection) and the conjugate momentum variable is a coordinate frame (called a vierbein) at each point. So these variable became what we know as Ashtekar variables, a particular flavor of Einstein–Cartan theory with a complex connection. General relativity theory expressed in this way, made possible to pursue quantization of it using well-known techniques from quantum gauge field theory.

The quantization of gravity in the Ashtekar formulation was based on Wilson loops, a technique developed by Kenneth G. Wilson in 1974 to study the strong-interaction regime of quantum chromodynamics (QCD). It is interesting in this connection that Wilson loops were known to be ill-behaved in the case of standard quantum field theory on (flat) Minkowski space, and so did not provide a nonperturbative quantization of QCD. However, because the Ashtekar formulation was background-independent, it was possible to use Wilson loops as the basis for nonperturbative quantization of gravity.

Due to efforts by Sen and Ashtekar, a setting in which the Wheeler–DeWitt equation was written in terms of a well-defined Hamiltonian operator on a well-defined Hilbert space was obtained. This led to the construction of the first known exact solution, the so-called Chern–Simons form or Kodama state. The physical interpretation of this state remains obscure.

In 1988–90, Carlo Rovelli and Lee Smolin obtained an explicit basis of states of quantum geometry, which turned out to be labeled by Penrose's spin networks. In this context, spin networks arose as a generalization of Wilson loops necessary to deal with mutually intersecting loops. Mathematically, spin networks are related to group representation theory and can be used to construct knot invariants such as the Jones polynomial. Loop quantum gravity (LQG) thus became related to topological quantum field theory and group representation theory.

In 1994, Rovelli and Smolin showed that the quantum operators of the theory associated to area and volume have a discrete spectrum. Work on the semi-classical limit, the continuum limit, and dynamics was intense after this, but progress was slower.

On the semi-classical limit front, the goal is to obtain and study analogues of the harmonic oscillator coherent states (candidates are known as weave states).

=== Hamiltonian dynamics ===
LQG was initially formulated as a quantization of the Hamiltonian ADM formalism, according to which the Einstein equations are a collection of constraints (Gauss, Diffeomorphism and Hamiltonian). The kinematics are encoded in the Gauss and Diffeomorphism constraints, whose solution is the space spanned by the spin network basis. The problem is to define the Hamiltonian constraint as a self-adjoint operator on the kinematical state space. The most promising work in this direction is Thomas Thiemann's Phoenix Project.

=== Covariant dynamics ===
Much of the recent work in LQG has been done in the covariant formulation of the theory, called "spin foam theory." The present version of the covariant dynamics is due to the convergent work of different groups, but it is commonly named after a paper by Jonathan Engle, Roberto Pereira and Carlo Rovelli in 2007–08. Heuristically, it would be expected that evolution between spin network states might be described by discrete combinatorial operations on the spin networks, which would then trace a two-dimensional skeleton of spacetime. This approach is related to state-sum models of statistical mechanics and topological quantum field theory such as the Turaeev–Viro model of 3D quantum gravity, and also to the Regge calculus approach to calculate the Feynman path integral of general relativity by discretizing spacetime.

== See also ==
- History of string theory
