= Mihalis Dafermos =

Greek mathematician (born 1976)

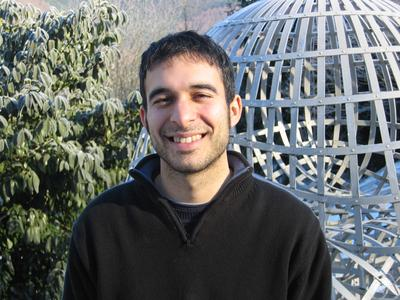
- Dafermos in 2006
- Born: October 1976 (age 50)
- Education: Harvard University (B.A. 1997); Princeton University (Ph.D. 2001)
- Awards: Adams Prize (2005); Whitehead Prize (2009)
- Scientific career
- Workplaces: MIT; University of Cambridge; Princeton University
- Thesis: Stability and Instability of the Cauchy Horizon for the Spherically Symmetric Einstein-Maxwell-Scalar Field Equations (2001)
- Doctoral advisor: Demetrios Christodoulou
- Website: www.dpmms.cam.ac.uk/~md384/

Mihalis Dafermos (Greek: Μιχάλης Δαφέρμος; born October 1976) is a Greek mathematician. He is Professor of Mathematics at Princeton University and holds the Lowndean Chair of Astronomy and Geometry at the University of Cambridge.

Dafermos studied mathematics at Harvard University and earned a bachelor's degree in 1997. He submitted his doctoral dissertation titled Stability and Instability of the Cauchy Horizon for the Spherically Symmetric Einstein-Maxwell-Scalar Field Equations in 2001, under the supervision of Demetrios Christodoulou at Princeton University.

He has won the Adams Prize writing on the subject Differential Equations in 2004 and the Whitehead Prize in 2009 for "his work on the rigorous analysis of hyperbolic partial differential equations in general relativity." In 2015 he was elected as a fellow of the American Mathematical Society.
