= Michael Broadhurst =

Japan international rugby union player

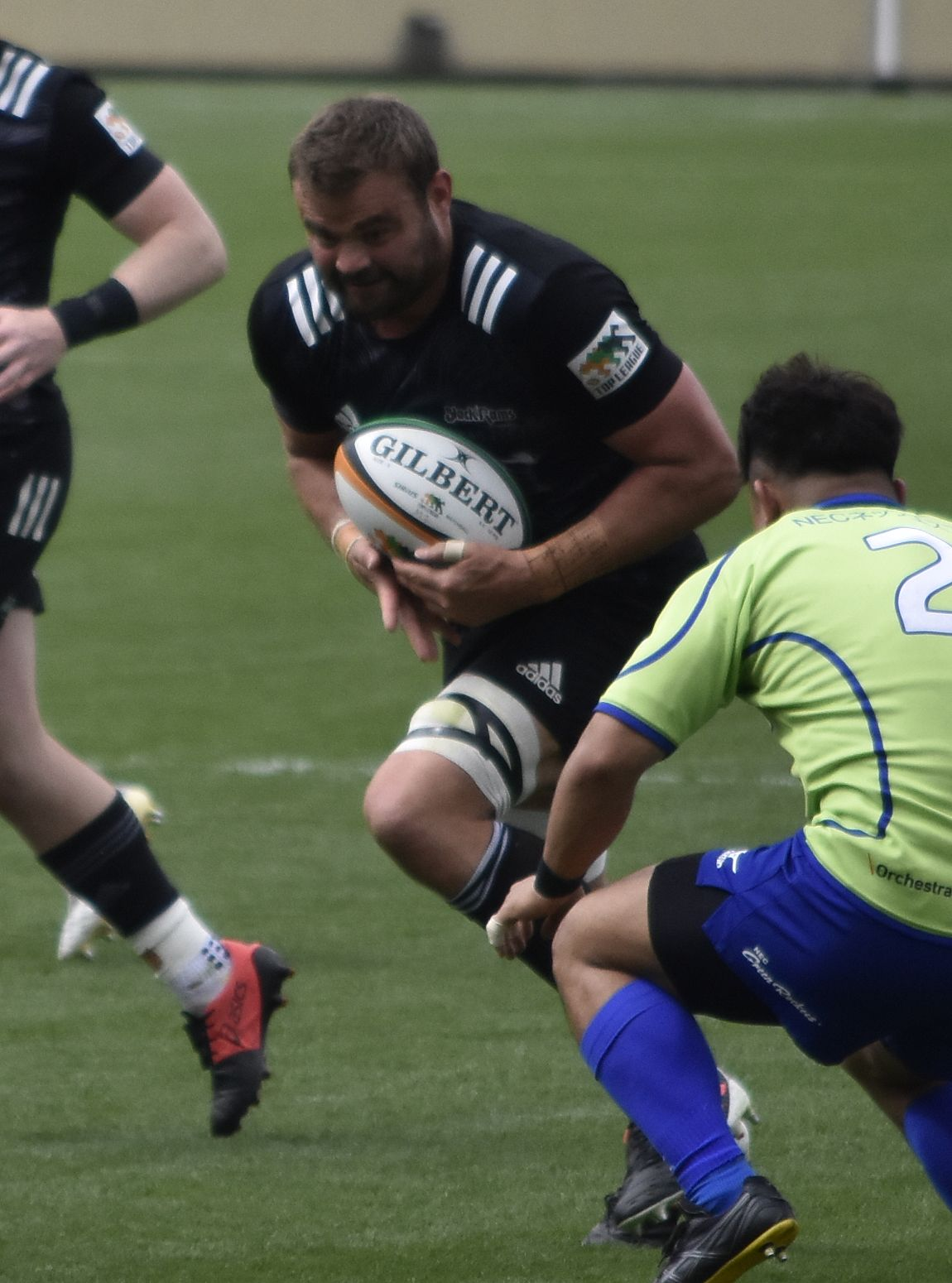
- Born: Michael John Broadhurst; 30 October 1986 (age 40) Gisborne, Poverty Bay, New Zealand
- Height: 196 cm (6 ft 5 in)
- Weight: 111 kg (17 st 7 lb; 245 lb)
- Notable relative: James Broadhurst (brother)

Rugby union career
- Position(s): Flanker, Lock, Number 8
Senior career
Years	Team	Apps	(Points)
2008	Poverty Bay	10	(20)
2009–2010	Kubota Spears	13	(10)
2010–2021	Ricoh Black Rams	138	(90)
- Correct as of 21 February 2021
International career
Years	Team	Apps	(Points)
2012–2015	Japan	26	(35)
- Correct as of 11 October 2015

Michael Broadhurst (born 30 October 1986) is a New Zealand born Japanese rugby union player who plays at flanker, lock or number 8 for the Ricoh Black Rams in the Top League and the Japan national rugby union team.

Broadhurst was educated at Campion College, Gisborne and started his career with Poverty Bay in the Heartland Championship and in 2008 he won selection for the New Zealand Heartland XV as one of the top players in the competition.

In 2009, Broadhurst moved to Japan to play for the Kubota Spears in the Top League who he spent one season with before moving to the Ricoh Black Rams. In 2012 he qualified to play for Japan through residency, and he played his first matches for them in June in the two matches series against the French Barbarians playing at lock and scored a try in the second match. Later in the year in November, he made his full capped debut for Japan coming off the bench in the wins against Romania and Georgia.

In 2013, with Michael Leitch out injured, Broadhurst won starting position in the team at flanker and notably scored tries in both matches of the two test matches against Wales in June, helping Japan to their first ever victory over the Welsh in the 2nd Test.

Broadhurst returned to the Japan team in 2015 after missing all of 2014 with injury, and started every match in their successful Rugby World Cup campaign. Following that tournament he retired from international rugby to spend more time with his family, but continued playing in Japan for the Ricoh Black Rams and became a Japanese citizen in 2017.

His younger brother James Broadhurst was also a professional rugby player until his retirement in 2017. James is also a former All Black.
