= Ruth Britto =

American mathematical physicist

Ruth Alexandra Britto-Pacumio is an American mathematical physicist whose research topics include black holes, Yang–Mills theory, and the theory of Feynman integrals; with Freddy Cachazo, Bo Feng, and Edward Witten she is one of the namesakes of the BCFW recursion relations for computing scattering amplitudes. She is an associate professor in mathematics and theoretical physics at Trinity College Dublin, and is also affiliated with the Institut de physique théorique - IPhT Saclay.

== Education and career ==
Britto is originally from Binghamton, New York, where her father, Ronald Britto, was a professor of economics at Binghamton University. As an undergraduate mathematics student at the Massachusetts Institute of Technology, she was the 1994 winner of the Elizabeth Lowell Putnam Prize for the best performance by a female student in the William Lowell Putnam Mathematical Competition, and the 1995 winner of the Alice T. Schafer Prize for Excellence in Mathematics by an Undergraduate Woman, awarded by the Association for Women in Mathematics.

She completed her Ph.D. in physics at Harvard University in 2002. Her dissertation, Bound states of supersymmetric black holes, was supervised by Andrew Strominger. She was a researcher at the Institute for Advanced Study, University of Amsterdam, Fermilab, and CEA Paris-Saclay before joining the Trinity College staff in 2014.
