= Soft photon =

Type of very low energy photons

In particle physics, soft photons are photons having photon energies much smaller than the energies of the particles participating in a particular scattering process, and they are not energetic enough to be detected. Such photons can be emitted from (or absorbed by) the external (incoming and outgoing) lines of charged particles of the Feynman diagram for the process. Even though soft photons are not detected, the possibility of their emission must be taken into account in the calculation of the scattering amplitude.

Taking the soft photons into account multiplies the rate of a given process by a factor which approaches zero. However, there is also an infrared-divergent contribution to the scattering rate related to virtual soft photons that are emitted from one of the external lines and absorbed in another (or in the same line). The two factors cancel each other, leaving a finite correction which depends on the sensitivity with which photons can be detected in the experiment.

Steven Weinberg's soft photon theorem simplifies the calculation of the contribution of soft photons to the scattering of particles.
