= Gravitational memory effect =

Predicted physical phenomenon

As the gravitational wave propagates perpendicular to the plane of inertial masses (in free fall), it is displaced by an amount proportional to the gravitational wave strain. After the gravitational wave has passed, the masses are permanently displaced, due to the gravitational memory effect.

Gravitational memory effects, also known as gravitational-wave memory effects, are predicted persistent changes in the relative position of pairs of masses in space due to the passing of a gravitational wave (GW). Detection of gravitational memory effects has been suggested as a way of validating general relativity.

A linear approximation of Einstein's equations was first proposed in 1974 by the Soviet scientists Yakov Zeldovich and A. G. Polnarev; Vladimir Braginsky and L. P. Grishchuk subsequently called these memory effects in 1985. The non-linear memory effect was first proposed in the 1990s by Demetrios Christodoulou.

In 2014 Andrew Strominger and Alexander Zhiboedov showed that the formula related to the memory effect is the Fourier transform in time of Steven Weinberg's soft graviton theorem. In general, memory effects are related to asymptotic behavior of the gravitational fields, as expected in the Bondi–Metzner–Sachs group through the infrared triangle. At null infinity, passing GWs leave a permanent distortion in spacetime, changing distances between objects and shifting observers. Observers who initially agree on the origin of their coordinate system may not agree after the waves pass. This leads to ambiguities, or supertranslations, in defining the angular momentum carried by GWs.

Gravitational spin memory is a proposed memory effect caused by GWs carrying angular momentum: that they leave a gravitational memory effect in the travel times of light sent around a closed loop in opposite directions. This proposed memory effect was published by Strominger, Zhiboedov, and one of Strominger's graduate students, Sabrina Pasterski, in 2016.

Memory effects are weaker than the oscillatory signals detected with ground-based interferometers such as LIGO. Proposed approaches for detection include stacking many events statistically and using low-frequency space-based detectors such as LISA. Core-collapse supernovae may generate strong memory effects because the explosions can be asymmetric. Such signals could be detected with proposed lunar-based detectors. Ramp-up signals may also be detectable on Earth with seismic noise filtering from relatively close supernovae, like those within the Milky Way.
