= Stephen Parke =

New Zealand physicist

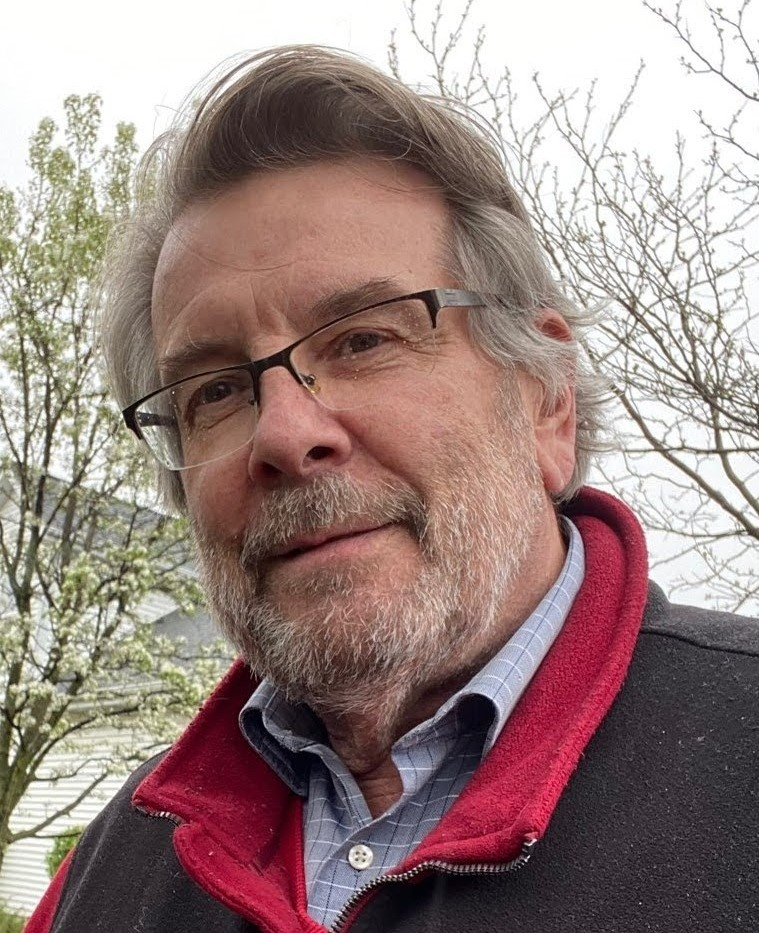
- Stephen Parke in 2020
- Born: Gisborne, New Zealand
- Education: Campion College, Gisborne; St Peter's College, Auckland; University of Auckland; Harvard University
- Known for: Parke–Taylor amplitudes, analytic understanding of MSW effect and top quark spin correlations/quantum entanglement
- Scientific career
- Fields: Theoretical physics
- Workplaces: Stanford Linear Accelerator Center; Fermi National Accelerator Laboratory
- Doctoral advisor: Sidney Coleman
- Other academic advisors: Sidney Drell

Stephen Parke is a New Zealand-American theoretical physicist. He is a distinguished scientist and former head (2010–2015) of the Theoretical Physics Department at the Fermi National Accelerator Laboratory Batavia, Illinois.

Born in Gisborne, New Zealand, Parke attended Campion College, Gisborne and St Peter's College, Auckland. He did his undergraduate studies, mathematics and physics, at the University of Auckland in New Zealand where his mentor was Dan Walls. He obtained a Fulbright Travel Grant and was awarded a Frank Knox Memorial Fellowship to attend graduate school at Harvard University. He was a graduate student of Sidney Coleman, obtaining a PhD in theoretical particle physics in 1980. He held a postdoctoral fellowship at the Stanford Linear Accelerator Center (1980–1983) collaborating with Sidney Drell before moving to the Fermi National Accelerator Laboratory as an Associate Scientist. He became an APS fellow in 1996 and in 2018 he was awarded a Doctorate of Science from the University of Auckland for his work on "Amplitudes in Gauge Theories". Parke's Erdos number is 3, having written papers with both Sidney Coleman and mathematician Terence Tao.

== Contributions to physics ==
He is an originator of Parke–Taylor amplitudes, which he developed with his colleague, Tomasz Taylor. Parke-Taylor amplitudes represent a new approach to computing scattering amplitudes in quantum chromodynamics using symmetry methods such as supersymmetry. This work was further extended in collaboration with Michelangelo Mangano and Xu Zhan. The discovery of the Parke-Taylor amplitudes ignited the amplitude revolution: a major advance in our understanding and calculability of scattering amplitudes in gauge theories, the foundation of particle physics. This advance is discussed in detail in Chapter 11 of Graham Farmelo's book "The Universe speaks in Numbers". Parke's important Amplitude papers are linked here.

With collaborator Gregory Mahon and others he pioneered the study of spin correlations in Top Quark pair production at Hadron collider which has led to the confirmation of quantum entanglement at the highest possible energy by ATLAS and CMS. Here is a link to his important Top Quark papers.

Parke is also an expert on neutrino physics. He gave the first analytical solution to the MSW effect including the non-adabatic region and has made important contributions to the physics of Long baseline Neutrino Oscillation experiments, T2K, NOvA, Hyper-Kamiokande and DUNE as well as the reactor experiments RENO, Daya Bay and JUNO. Here is a link to his important Neutrino papers.

He has also written papers on Magnetic Monopoles and the decay of the false vacuum in curved space time.

== Personal life ==
Parke's father was the orthopedic surgeon William Parke and mother Muriel Parke (née Stephens), a school teacher. His parents both born in Liverpool immigrated from the UK to New Zealand in 1949 to help with the polio epidemic raging in New Zealand at that time. Parke is a nephew of marine botanist Mary Parke.

Parke is married to Winifred Haun, the MacArthur Foundation and 3Arts award-winning Choreographer and artistic director of the contemporary dance company Winifred Haun & Dancers. They have three daughters: Athena, Iris and Selene.

== See also ==
- List of alumni of St Peter's College, Auckland for more biographical details
