= Tomasz Robert Taylor =

Polish theoretical physicist

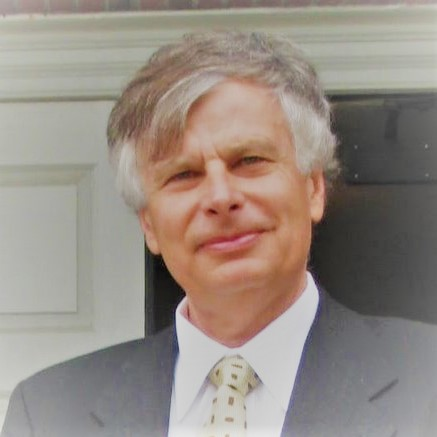
- Born: February 23, 1954 (age 72); Poznań, Poland
- Education: University of Warsaw
- Known for: Parke–Taylor amplitudes
- Scientific career
- Fields: Theoretical physics
- Workplaces: Northeastern University; Fermilab; CERN; University of Warsaw
- Doctoral advisor: Stefan Pokorski

Tomasz Robert Taylor (born February 23, 1954) is a Polish-American theoretical physicist and faculty at Northeastern University in Boston, Massachusetts, United States of America. He obtained his PhD degree from the University of Warsaw, Poland in 1981 under the supervision of Stefan Pokorski. He is a descendant of John Taylor who originated from Fraserburgh in Scotland and emigrated to the Polish-Lithuanian Commonwealth c.1676.

He is known for his discovery, with Stephen Parke, of Parke–Taylor amplitudes, also known as maximally helicity violating (MHV) amplitudes; his pioneering use of supersymmetry for computing scattering amplitudes in quantum chromodynamics; his seminal work, with Ignatios Antoniadis, Edi Gava and Kumar Narain, on topological string amplitudes; his formulation, with Ignatios Antoniadis and Hervé Partouche, of the first four-dimensional quantum field theory with partial supersymmetry breaking; his extensive studies, with Stephan Stieberger, of superstring scattering amplitudes.

== Honors ==
- 2009 Fellowship of the American Physical Society
- 2015 Membership in the Polish Academy of Learning
