= MHV amplitudes =

Maximally helicity violating amplitudes

In theoretical particle physics, maximally helicity violating amplitudes (MHV) are amplitudes with $n$ massless external gauge bosons, where $n-2$ gauge bosons have a particular helicity and the other two have the opposite helicity. These amplitudes are called MHV amplitudes, because at tree level, they violate helicity conservation to the maximum extent possible. The tree amplitudes in which all gauge bosons have the same helicity or all but one have the same helicity vanish.

MHV amplitudes may be calculated very efficiently by means of the Parke–Taylor formula.

Although developed for pure gluon scattering, extensions exist for massive particles, scalars (the Higgs) and for fermions (quarks and their interactions in QCD).

== Parke–Taylor amplitudes ==
Work done in 1980s by Stephen Parke and Tomasz Taylor found that when considering the scattering of many gluons, certain classes of amplitude vanish at tree level; in particular when fewer than two gluons have negative helicity (and all the rest have positive helicity):

$$\mathcal{A}(1^+ \cdots n^+) = 0,$$
$$\mathcal{A}(1^+ \cdots i^- \cdots n^+) = 0.$$

The first non-vanishing case occurs when two gluons have negative helicity. Such amplitudes are known as "maximally helicity violating" and have an extremely simple form in terms of momentum bilinears, independent of the number of gluons present:

$$\mathcal{A}(1^+\cdots i^- \cdots j^- \cdots n^+)
= i(-g)^{n-2} \frac{\langle i \; j\rangle^4}{\langle 1\;2 \rangle \langle 2\;3 \rangle \cdots \langle (n-1)\;n\rangle \langle n \; 1 \rangle}$$

The compactness of these amplitudes makes them extremely attractive, particularly for data taking at the LHC, for which it is necessary to remove the dominant background of Standard Model events. A rigorous derivation of the Parke–Taylor amplitudes was given by Berends and Giele.

== CSW rules ==
The MHV were given a geometrical interpretation using Witten's twistor string theory which in turn inspired a technique of "sewing" MHV amplitudes together (with some off-shell continuation) to build arbitrarily complex tree diagrams. The rules for this formalism are called the CSW rules (after Freddy Cachazo, Peter Svrcek, Edward Witten), with their extension at loop level developed by Brandhuber, Spence and Travaglini.

There are missing pieces in this framework, most importantly the $(++-)$ vertex, which is clearly non-MHV in form. In pure Yang–Mills theory this vertex vanishes on-shell, but it is necessary to construct the $(++++)$ amplitude at one loop. This amplitude vanishes in any supersymmetric theory, but does not in the non-supersymmetric case.

The other drawback is the reliance on cut-constructibility to compute the loop integrals. This therefore cannot recover the rational parts of amplitudes (i.e. those not containing cuts).

== The MHV Lagrangian ==
A Lagrangian whose perturbation theory gives rise to the CSW rules can be obtained by performing a canonical change of variables on the light-cone Yang–Mills (LCYM) Lagrangian. The LCYM Lagrangrian has the following helicity structure:

$$L[A] = L^{+-}[A] + L^{-++}[A] + L^{--++}[A].$$

The transformation involves absorbing the non-MHV three-point vertex into the kinetic term in a new field variable:

$$L^{+-} [A] + L^{++-}[A] = L^{+-}[B].$$

When this transformation is solved as a series expansion in the new field variable, it gives rise to an effective Lagrangian with an infinite series of MHV terms:

$$L[B] = L^{+-}[B] + L^{--+}[B] + L^{--++}[B] + L^{--+++}[B] + \cdots$$

The perturbation theory of this Lagrangian has been shown (up to the five-point vertex) to recover the CSW rules. Moreover, the missing amplitudes which plague the CSW approach turn out to be recovered within the MHV Lagrangian framework via evasions of the S-matrix equivalence theorem.

An alternative approach to the MHV Lagrangian recovers the missing pieces mentioned above by using Lorentz-violating counterterms.

== BCFW recursion ==
BCFW recursion, also known as the Britto–Cachazo–Feng–Witten (BCFW) on-shell recursion method, is a way of calculating scattering amplitudes. Extensive use is now made of these techniques.
