= Twistor correspondence =

In mathematical physics, the twistor correspondence (also known as Penrose–Ward correspondence) is a bijection between instantons on complexified Minkowski space and holomorphic vector bundles on twistor space, which as a complex manifold is $\mathbb{P}^3$, or complex projective 3-space. Twistor space was introduced by Roger Penrose, while Richard Ward formulated the correspondence between instantons and vector bundles on twistor space.

== Statement ==
There is a bijection between

1. Gauge equivalence classes of anti-self dual Yang–Mills (ASDYM) connections on complexified Minkowski space $M_\mathbb{C} \cong \mathbb{C}^4$ with gauge group $\mathrm{GL}(n, \mathbb{C})$ (the complex general linear group)
2. Holomorphic rank n vector bundles $E$ over projective twistor space $\mathcal{PT} \cong \mathbb{P}^3 - \mathbb{P}^1$ which are trivial on each degree one section of $\mathcal{PT} \rightarrow \mathbb{P}^1$.

where $\mathbb{P}^n$ is the complex projective space of dimension $n$.

== Applications ==
=== ADHM construction ===
On the anti-self dual Yang–Mills side, the solutions, known as instantons, extend to solutions on compactified Euclidean 4-space. On the twistor side, the vector bundles extend from $\mathcal{PT}$ to $\mathbb{P}^3$, and the reality condition on the ASDYM side corresponds to a reality structure on the algebraic bundles on the twistor side. Holomorphic vector bundles over $\mathbb{P}^3$ have been extensively studied in the field of algebraic geometry, and all relevant bundles can be generated by the monad construction also known as the ADHM construction, hence giving a classification of instantons.
