= Penrose transform =

In theoretical physics, the Penrose transform, introduced by Roger Penrose (1967, 1968, 1969), is a complex analogue of the Radon transform that relates massless fields on spacetime, or more precisely the space of solutions to massless field equations, to sheaf cohomology groups on complex projective space. The projective space in question is the twistor space, a geometrical space naturally associated to the original spacetime, and the twistor transform is also geometrically natural in the sense of integral geometry. The Penrose transform is a major component of classical twistor theory.

== Overview ==
Abstractly, the Penrose transform operates on a double fibration of a space Y, over two spaces X and Z

$$Z\xleftarrow{\eta} Y \xrightarrow{\tau} X.$$

In the classical Penrose transform, Y is the spin bundle, X is a compactified and complexified form of Minkowski space (which as a complex manifold is $\mathbf{Gr}(2,4)$) and Z is the twistor space (which is $\mathbb{P}^3$). More general examples come from double fibrations of the form

$$G/H_1\xleftarrow{\eta} G/(H_1\cap H_2) \xrightarrow{\tau} G/H_2$$

where G is a complex semisimple Lie group and H_{1} and H_{2} are parabolic subgroups.

The Penrose transform operates in two stages. First, one pulls back the sheaf cohomology groups H^{r}(Z,F) to the sheaf cohomology H^{r}(Y,η^{−1}F) on Y; in many cases where the Penrose transform is of interest, this pullback turns out to be an isomorphism. One then pushes the resulting cohomology classes down to X (see also Fourie-Mukai transform); that is, one investigates the direct image of a cohomology class by means of the Leray spectral sequence. The resulting direct image is then interpreted in terms of differential equations. In the case of the classical Penrose transform, the resulting differential equations are precisely the massless field equations for a given spin.

== Example ==
The classical example is given as follows

- The "twistor space" Z is complex projective 3-space CP^{3}, which is also the Grassmannian Gr_{1}(C^{4}) of lines in 4-dimensional complex space.
- X = Gr_{2}(C^{4}), the Grassmannian of 2-planes in 4-dimensional complex space. This is a compactification of complex Minkowski space.
- Y is the flag manifold whose elements correspond to a line in a plane of C^{4}.
- G is the group SL_{4}(C) and H_{1} and H_{2} are the parabolic subgroups fixing a line or a plane containing this line.

The maps from Y to X and Z are the natural projections.

Using spinor index notation, the Penrose transform gives a bijection between solutions to the spin $\pm n/2$ massless field equation
$$\partial_A\,^{A_1'}\phi_{A_1'A_2'\cdots A_n'} = 0$$
and the first sheaf cohomology group $H^1(\mathbb{P}^1, \mathcal{O}(\pm n-2))$, where $\mathbb{P}^1$ is the Riemann sphere, $\mathcal{O}(k)$ are the usual holomorphic line bundles over projective space, and the sheaves under consideration are the sheaves of sections of $\mathcal{O}(k)$.

== Penrose–Ward transform ==
The Penrose–Ward transform is a nonlinear modification of the Penrose transform, introduced by Ward (1977), that (among other things) relates holomorphic vector bundles on 3-dimensional complex projective space CP^{3} to solutions of the self-dual Yang–Mills equations on S^{4}. Atiyah & Ward (1977) used this to describe instantons in terms of algebraic vector bundles on complex projective 3-space and Atiyah (1979) explained how this could be used to classify instantons on a 4-sphere.

== See also ==
- Twistor correspondence
