= Cellular decomposition =

In geometric topology, a cellular decomposition G of a manifold M is a decomposition of M as the disjoint union of cells (spaces homeomorphic to n-balls B^{n}).

The quotient space M/G has points that correspond to the cells of the decomposition. There is a natural map from M to M/G, which is given the quotient topology. A fundamental question is whether M is homeomorphic to M/G. Bing's dogbone space is an example with M (equal to R^{3}) not homeomorphic to M/G.

== Definition ==
Cellular decomposition of $X$ is an open cover $\mathcal{E}$ with a function $\text{deg}:\mathcal{E}\to \mathbb{Z}$ for which:

- Cells are disjoint: for any distinct $e,e'\in\mathcal{E}$, $e\cap e' = \varnothing$.
- No set gets mapped to a negative number: $\text{deg}^{-1}(\{j\in\mathbb Z\mid j\leq -1\}) = \varnothing$.
- Cells look like balls: For any $n\in\mathbb N_0$ and for any $e\in \deg^{-1}(n)$ there exists a continuous map $\phi:B^n\to X$ that is an isomorphism $\text{int}B^n\cong e$ and also $\phi(\partial B^n) \subseteq \cup \text{deg}^{-1}(n-1)$.

A cell complex is a pair $(X,\mathcal E)$ where $X$ is a topological space and $\mathcal E$ is a cellular decomposition of $X$.

== See also ==
- CW complex
