= BCFW recursion =

Set of recursion relations in quantum field theory

The Britto–Cachazo–Feng–Witten recursion relations are a set of on-shell recursion relations in quantum field theory. They are named for their creators, Ruth Britto, Freddy Cachazo, Bo Feng and Edward Witten.

The BCFW recursion method is a way of calculating scattering amplitudes. This technique is widely used in analytic calculations due to the relative conciseness of the resulting expressions, when compared to the more traditional methods. The principal property of the BCFW recursion is that at every stage of the calculation it involves exclusively real (on-shell) particles, as opposed to the virtual (off-shell) particles that propagate inside conventional Feynman diagrams. Initially formulated in Yang-Mills theory, the BCFW was soon extended to include amplitudes in general relativity.

== See also ==
- MHV amplitudes
