= Twistor theory =

Theory proposed by Roger Penrose

In theoretical physics, twistor theory was proposed by Roger Penrose in 1967 as a unification of general relativity (space-time geometry) and quantum mechanics (quantum theory) and has subsequently evolved into a widely studied branch of theoretical and mathematical physics. Penrose's idea was that twistor space should be the basic arena for physics from which space-time itself should emerge. It has led to powerful mathematical tools that have applications to differential and integral geometry, nonlinear differential equations and representation theory, and in physics to general relativity, quantum field theory, and the theory of scattering amplitudes.

Twistor theory arose in the context of the rapidly expanding mathematical developments in Einstein's theory of general relativity in the late 1950s and in the 1960s and carries a number of influences from that period. In particular, Roger Penrose has credited Ivor Robinson as an important early influence in the development of twistor theory, through his construction of so-called Robinson congruences.

== Overview ==
Projective twistor space $\mathbb{PT}$ is projective 3-space $\mathbb{CP}^3$, the simplest 3-dimensional compact algebraic variety. It has a physical interpretation as the space of massless particles with spin. It is the projectivisation of a 4-dimensional complex vector space, non-projective twistor space $\mathbb{T}$, with a Hermitian form of signature (2, 2) and a holomorphic volume form. This can be most naturally understood as the space of chiral (Weyl) spinors for the conformal group SO(4,2)/Z_{2} of Minkowski space; it is the fundamental representation of the spin group SU(2,2) of the conformal group. This definition can be extended to arbitrary dimensions except that beyond dimension four, one defines projective twistor space to be the space of projective pure spinors for the conformal group.

In its original form, twistor theory encodes physical fields on Minkowski space in terms of complex analytic objects on twistor space via the Penrose transform. This is especially natural for massless fields of arbitrary spin. In the first instance these are obtained via contour integral formulae in terms of free holomorphic functions on regions in twistor space. The holomorphic twistor functions that give rise to solutions to the massless field equations can be more deeply understood as Čech representatives of analytic cohomology classes on regions in $\mathbb{PT}$. These correspondences have been extended to certain nonlinear fields, including self-dual gravity in Penrose's nonlinear graviton construction and self-dual Yang–Mills fields in the so-called Ward construction; the former gives rise to deformations of the underlying complex structure of regions in $\mathbb{PT}$, and the latter to certain holomorphic vector bundles over regions in $\mathbb{PT}$. These constructions have had wide applications, including inter alia the theory of integrable systems.

The self-duality condition is a major limitation for incorporating the full nonlinearities of physical theories, although it does suffice for Yang–Mills–Higgs monopoles and instantons (see ADHM construction). An early attempt to overcome this restriction was the introduction of ambitwistors by Isenberg, Yasskin and Green, and their superspace extension, super-ambitwistors, by Edward Witten. Ambitwistor space is the space of complexified light rays or massless particles and can be regarded as a complexification or cotangent bundle of the original twistor description. By extending the ambitwistor correspondence to suitably defined formal neighborhoods, Isenberg, Yasskin and Green showed the equivalence between the vanishing of the curvature along such extended null lines and the full Yang–Mills field equations. Witten showed that a further extension, within the framework of super Yang–Mills theory, including fermionic and scalar fields, gave rise, in the case of N = 1 or 2 supersymmetry, to the constraint equations, while for N = 3 (or 4), the vanishing condition for supercurvature along super null lines (super ambitwistors) implied the full set of field equations, including those for the fermionic fields. This was subsequently shown to give a 1-1 equivalence between the null curvature constraint equations and the supersymmetric Yang-Mills field equations. Through dimensional reduction, it may also be deduced from the analogous super-ambitwistor correspondence for 10-dimensional, N = 1 super-Yang–Mills theory.

Twistorial formulae for interactions beyond the self-dual sector also arose in Witten's twistor string theory, which is a quantum theory of holomorphic maps of a Riemann surface into twistor space. This gave rise to the remarkably compact RSV (Roiban, Spradlin and Volovich) formulae for tree-level S-matrices of Yang–Mills theories, but its gravity degrees of freedom gave rise to a version of conformal supergravity limiting its applicability; conformal gravity is an unphysical theory containing ghosts, but its interactions are combined with those of Yang–Mills theory in loop amplitudes calculated via twistor string theory.

Despite its shortcomings, twistor string theory led to rapid developments in the study of scattering amplitudes. One was the so-called MHV formalism loosely based on disconnected strings, but was given a more basic foundation in terms of a twistor action for full Yang–Mills theory in twistor space. Another key development was the introduction of BCFW recursion. This has a natural formulation in twistor space that in turn led to remarkable formulations of scattering amplitudes in terms of Grassmann integral formulae and polytopes. These ideas have evolved more recently into the positive Grassmannian and amplituhedron.

Twistor string theory was extended first by generalising the RSV Yang–Mills amplitude formula, and then by finding the underlying string theory. The extension to gravity was given by Cachazo & Skinner, and formulated as a twistor string theory for maximal supergravity by David Skinner. Analogous formulae were then found in all dimensions by Cachazo, He and Yuan for Yang–Mills theory and gravity and subsequently for a variety of other theories. They were then understood as string theories in ambitwistor space by Mason and Skinner in a general framework that includes the original twistor string and extends to give a number of new models and formulae. As string theories they have the same critical dimensions as conventional string theory; for example the type II supersymmetric versions are critical in ten dimensions and are equivalent to the full field theory of type II supergravities in ten dimensions (this is distinct from conventional string theories that also have a further infinite hierarchy of massive higher spin states that provide an ultraviolet completion). They extend to give formulae for loop amplitudes and can be defined on curved backgrounds.

== Twistor correspondence ==
Denote Minkowski space by $M$, with coordinates $x^a = (t, x, y, z)$ and Lorentzian metric $\eta_{ab}$ signature $(1, 3)$. Introduce 2-component spinor indices $A = 0, 1;\; A' = 0', 1',$ and set

$$x^{AA'} = \frac{1}{\sqrt{2}}\begin{pmatrix} t - z & x + iy \\ x - iy & t + z \end{pmatrix}.$$

Non-projective twistor space $\mathbb{T}$ is a four-dimensional complex vector space with coordinates denoted by $Z^{\alpha} = \left(\omega^{A},\, \pi_{A'}\right)$ where $\omega^A$ and $\pi_{A'}$ are two constant Weyl spinors. The hermitian form can be expressed by defining a complex conjugation from $\mathbb{T}$ to its dual $\mathbb{T}^*$ by $\bar Z_\alpha = \left(\bar\pi_A,\, \bar \omega^{A'}\right)$ so that the Hermitian form can be expressed as

$$Z^\alpha \bar Z_\alpha = \omega^{A}\bar\pi_{A} + \bar\omega^{A'}\pi_{A'}.$$

This together with the holomorphic volume form, $\varepsilon_{\alpha\beta\gamma\delta} Z^\alpha dZ^\beta \wedge dZ^\gamma \wedge dZ^\delta$ is invariant under the group SU(2,2), a quadruple cover of the conformal group C(1,3) of compactified Minkowski spacetime.

Points in Minkowski space are related to subspaces of twistor space through the incidence relation

$$\omega^{A} = ix^{AA'}\pi_{A'}.$$

The incidence relation is preserved under an overall complex rescaling of the twistor. This scaling assigns a flagpole extent, flag-plane direction, and a spinorial sign to the ray $\mathbf{Z}\in\mathbb{PT}$. A real translation $x^{a}\rightarrow x^{a}+q^{a}$ will leave $Z^{\alpha}$ invariant whenever $q^{a}$ has the form $q^{a}=u \bar{\pi}^{A}\pi^{A'}$, where $u$ is a real number, so the translation moves the point $\mathbf{x}$ to some other point on the ray $\mathbf{Z}$. Fixing a point $x\in M$ instead determines a line $\mathbb{CP}^1$ in $\mathbb{PT}$ parametrised by $\pi_{A'}$. If $x\in\mathbb{R}$, then $Z^\alpha \bar Z_\alpha$ necessarily vanishes and the corresponding complex projective line lies within the five-dimensional space of null twistors $\mathbb{PN}$. For non-null twistors $Z^\alpha \bar Z_\alpha$ is non-vanishing, so that there are no real solutions. Non-null twistors have a physical interpretation as massless particles with spin. They are not localized in spacetime, since no ray is singled out which could be regarded as the particle's world-line.

== Variations ==
=== Supertwistors ===
Supertwistors are a supersymmetric extension of twistors introduced by Alan Ferber in 1978. Non-projective twistor space is extended by fermionic coordinates where $\mathcal{N}$ is the number of supersymmetries so that a twistor is now given by $\left(\omega^A,\, \pi_{A'},\, \eta^i\right), i = 1, \ldots, \mathcal{N}$ with $\eta^i$ anticommuting. The super conformal group SU(2,2 | $\mathcal{N}$) naturally acts on this space and a supersymmetric version of the Penrose transform takes cohomology classes on supertwistor space to massless supersymmetric multiplets on super Minkowski space. The $\mathcal{N}$ = 4 case provides the target for Penrose's original twistor string and the $\mathcal{N} = 8$ case is that for Skinner's supergravity generalisation.

=== Higher dimensional generalization of the Klein correspondence ===
A higher dimensional generalization of the Klein correspondence underlying twistor theory, applicable to isotropic subspaces of conformally compactified (complexified) Minkowski space and its super-space extensions, was developed by J. Harnad and S. Shnider.

=== Hyperkähler manifolds ===
Hyperkähler manifolds of dimension $4k$ also admit a twistor correspondence with a twistor space of complex dimension $2k+1$.

=== Palatial twistor theory ===
The nonlinear graviton construction encodes only anti-self-dual, i.e., left-handed fields. A first step towards the problem of modifying twistor space in order to encode a general gravitational field is the encoding of right-handed fields. Infinitesimally, these are encoded in twistor functions or cohomology classes of homogeneity −6. The task of using such twistor functions in a fully nonlinear way in order to obtain a right-handed nonlinear graviton has been referred to as the (gravitational) googly problem. (The word "googly" is a term used in the game of cricket for a ball bowled with right-handed helicity using the apparent action that would normally give rise to left-handed helicity.) The most recent proposal in this direction by Penrose in 2015 was based on noncommutative geometry on twistor space and referred to as palatial twistor theory. The theory is named after Buckingham Palace, where Michael Atiyah suggested to Penrose the use of a type of "noncommutative algebra", an important component of the theory. (The underlying twistor structure in palatial twistor theory was modeled not on the twistor space but on the non-commutative holomorphic twistor quantum algebra.)

== See also ==
- Background independence
- Complex spacetime
- History of loop quantum gravity
- Robinson congruences
- Spin network
- Twisted geometries
