= Twistor space =

Space in mathematics and theoretical physics

In mathematics and theoretical physics (especially twistor theory), twistor space is the complex vector space of solutions of the twistor equation $\nabla_{A'}^{(A}\Omega_{^{}}^{B)}=0$. It was described in the 1960s by Roger Penrose and Malcolm MacCallum. According to Andrew Hodges, twistor space is useful for conceptualizing the way photons travel through space, using four complex numbers. He also posits that twistor space may aid in understanding the asymmetry of the weak nuclear force.

== Informal motivation ==
In the (translated) words of Jacques Hadamard: "the shortest path between two truths in the real domain passes through the complex domain." Therefore when studying four-dimensional space $\mathbb{R}^4$ it might be valuable to identify it with $\mathbb{C}^2.$ However, since there is no canonical way of doing so, instead all isomorphisms respecting orientation and metric between the two are considered. It turns out that complex projective 3-space $\mathbb{CP}^3$ parametrizes such isomorphisms together with complex coordinates. Thus one complex coordinate describes the identification and the other two describe a point in $\mathbb{R}^4$. It turns out that vector bundles with self-dual connections on $\mathbb{R}^4$(instantons) correspond bijectively to holomorphic vector bundles on complex projective 3-space $\mathbb{CP}^3$.

== Formal definition ==
For Minkowski space, denoted $\mathbb{M}$, the solutions to the twistor equation are of the form

$$\Omega^A(x)=\omega^A-ix^{AA'}\pi_{A'}$$

where $\omega^A$ and $\pi_{A'}$ are two constant Weyl spinors and $x^{AA'}=\sigma^{AA'}_\mu x^{\mu}$ is a point in Minkowski space. The $\sigma_\mu=(I,\vec\sigma)$ are the Pauli matrices, with $A,A^\prime=1,2$ the indexes on the matrices. This twistor space is a four-dimensional complex vector space, whose points are denoted by $Z^{\alpha}=(\omega^{A},\pi_{A'})$, and with a hermitian form

$$\Sigma(Z)=\omega^{A}\bar\pi_{A}+\bar\omega^{A'}\pi_{A'}$$

which is invariant under the group SU(2,2) which is a quadruple cover of the conformal group C(1,3) of compactified Minkowski spacetime.

Points in Minkowski space are related to subspaces of twistor space through the incidence relation

$$\omega^{A}=ix^{AA'}\pi_{A'}.$$

This incidence relation is preserved under an overall re-scaling of the twistor, so usually one works in projective twistor space, denoted $\mathbb{PT}$, which is isomorphic as a complex manifold to $\mathbb{CP}^3$.

Given a point $x\in M$ it is related to a line in projective twistor space where we can see the incidence relation as giving the linear embedding of a $\mathbb{CP}^1$ parametrized by $\pi_{A'}$.

The geometric relation between projective twistor space and complexified compactified Minkowski space is the same as the relation between lines and two-planes in twistor space; more precisely, twistor space is

$$\mathbb{T} := \mathbb{C}^4.$$

It has associated to it the double fibration of flag manifolds $\mathbb{P}\xleftarrow{\mu} \mathbb{F} \xrightarrow{\nu} \mathbb{M}$ where $\mathbb{P}$ is the projective twistor space

$$\mathbb{P}=F_1(\mathbb{T})=\mathbb{CP}^3=\mathbf{P}(\mathbb{C}^4)$$

and $\mathbb{M}$ is the compactified complexified Minkowski space

$$\mathbb{M}=F_2(\mathbb{T})=\operatorname{Gr}_2(\mathbb{C}^4)= \operatorname{Gr}_{2,4}(\mathbb{C})$$

and the correspondence space between $\mathbb{P}$ and $\mathbb{M}$ is

$$\mathbb{F}=F_{1,2}(\mathbb{T})$$

In the above, $\mathbf{P}$ stands for projective space, $\operatorname{Gr}$ a Grassmannian, and $F$ a flag manifold. The double fibration gives rise to two correspondences (see also Penrose transform), $c=\nu\circ\mu^{-1}$ and $c^{-1}=\mu\circ\nu^{-1}.$

The compactified complexified Minkowski space $\mathbb{M}$ is embedded in $\mathbf{P}_5 \cong\mathbf{P}(\wedge^2\mathbb{T})$ by the Plücker embedding; the image is the Klein quadric.

== See also ==
- Lorentz force
