= Kolowrat family =

Czech noble family

House of Kolowrat
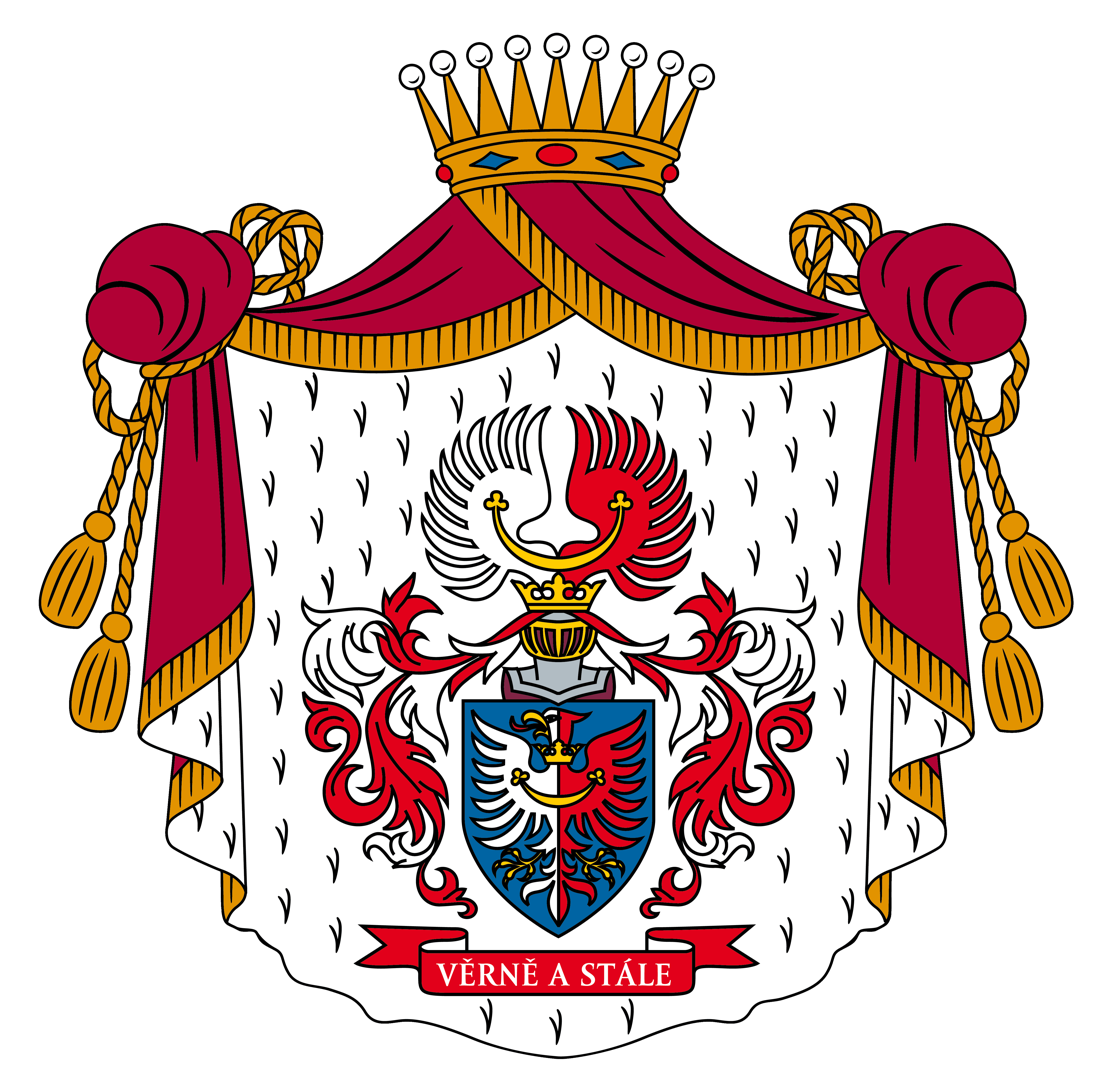
- Country: Kingdom of Bohemia; Holy Roman Empire; Austrian Empire; Austria-Hungary
- Founded: 1347 – Albrecht the Elder of Kolowrat
- Current head: Count Maximilián Alexander Kolowrat-Krakowský
- Titles: Lords; Counts; Imperial Counts
- Cadet branches: Krakowsky; Liebsteinsky; Kornhauzsky; Zehrovicky; Bezdruzicky; Nowohradsky; Mastovsky; Cernonicky

The House of Kolowrat is a Czech noble family that had a prominent role in the history and administration of their native Kingdom of Bohemia as well as the Holy Roman Empire and later the Habsburg monarchy as high-ranking officials and supporters of the Czech National Revival.

The family origins are so far back in time that they are not recorded in any extant Bohemian historical documents. Only a few legends, such as those recounted by historians Bohuslav Balbín and František Palacký, give an account of those origins. The first historically documented Kolowrat is Albrecht of Kolowrat the Elder (cs). The family rose to prominence during the Habsburg Monarchy, during which its members held some of the highest political, military, and clerical offices, including serving as Minister-Presidents, Supreme Chancellors, field marshals, archbishops, and knights of the Order of the Golden Fleece.

== History ==
=== The Founder of the House ===
Albrecht the Elder of Kolowrat, whose ancestors came from the village of Kolovraty, is considered to be the founder of the dynasty. Being a hetman and the court marshal of Anna of Schweidnitz (wife of Charles IV), and an assessor of the provincial and royal feudal court, he entered historical documents in 1347 when Rožmitál castle was sold and he was mentioned as an assessing witness. He married three times and had eight children, six of which were sons who later laid the foundations of the House of Kolowrat. In 1373, Albrecht of Kolowrat established an Augustinian monastery of the Assumption in Ročov, where he was later buried.

=== 14th century ===
The founder of the family and the first documented member of the Kolowrat family was Lord Albrecht the Elder (†1391). He was first mentioned as a witness in the sale of Rožmitál Castle in 1347. He is known primarily because he became the marshal of Empress Anna of Schweidnitz (wife of Charles IV, Holy Roman Emperor), and Governor of Vogtland. Together with his sons, he founded the Augustinian monastery of the Virgin Mary in Dolni Ročov. Here, Lord Albrecht the Elder is also buried, and his gravestone is tied to a family legend that has persisted for centuries. Lord Albrecht's sons and grandchildren laid the foundations of eight noble branches of the Kolowrat family. His oldest son, Lord Albrecht the Younger (1369–1416), founded a branch of Kolowrat-Liebsteinsky and perhaps Kolowrat-Krakowsky, whose descendants still live today. Following his father's example, he financially supported the monastery in Dolni Ročov.

=== 15th century ===
Hanuš I. Liebsteinsky (1390–1450) became one of the most powerful people in the country, as in 1437 he became one of six interim administrators of the Czech Kingdom (together with Oldrich II. of Rosenberg, Meinhard of Neuhaus, Ales of Sternberg, Nicholas of Hazmburg, and Zikmund of Warttenberg) before the new King took over the government. He was a supporter of King Sigismund, who gave him the castles of Žebrák, Točník, and Dobříš. Later he became the Governor of the Prague cities and was a well known adversary of George of Poděbrady, King of Bohemia. He was also involved in the Hussite Wars. His son, Hanuš II. (1430–1483), unlike his grandfather and father, did not enter politics as was expected of him, but instead turned to the church and became the administrator of the Prague Archbishopric. He became famous as the patron of the Catholic Church, when in 1465, he donated the golden, precious-jewel inlaid Kolowrat prayer book with relics of Czech saints to the Saint Vitus Cathedral Treasure (the largest and most important Treasure in Czech Republic, and one of the most extensive in Europe). To the Chapter Library, he bequeathed the rare, illuminated manuscript of his travel breviary among others. Of the Žehrovský family, we can mention Jan (1434–1473), who, unlike other members of his extended family, became an ally of King George of Poděbrady, and took part in his mission of peace in Central and Western Europe between 1465 and 1467.

=== 16th century ===
Of the Nowohradský family, the best-known is Jáchym (2nd half of the 16th century), who built a political career as a vice-governor in the court of Emperor Rudolf II. He also became burgrave of Karlštejn, and while holding this position, he had Karlštejn castle markedly repaired and enlarged. Thus, he held both provincial and the court offices, which was not very common. Further, we can also name Ignác Jindřich (1575/77–1628), who became famous for his ecclesiastical career as a representative of Olomouc Bishop František cardinal Dietrichstein, and subsequently was even elected as provost of the Olomouc chapter. Of the members of the Bezdružický family we'll mention George (1481–1526), who was the supreme judge and who witnessed the rivalry of the nobles and the royal cities over power in the land. Another important member of the family was Václav († pre–1539), who was the supreme feudal judge and burgrave at Vyšehrad. He continued with the tradition of supporting of the monastery in Dolní Ročov, thus becoming responsible for extensive reconstruction of the entire building.

=== 17th century ===
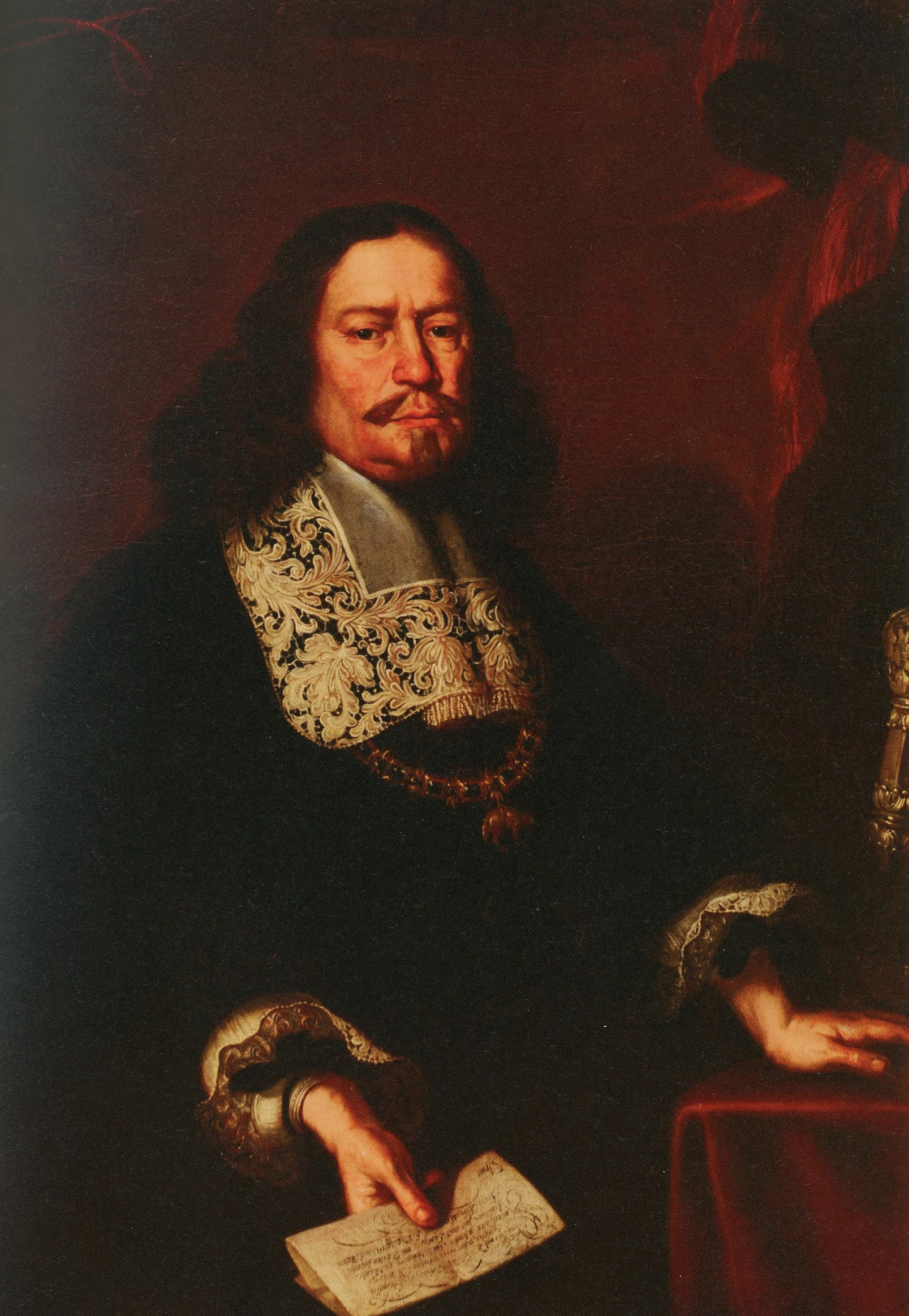
Count Franz Karl I. Kolowrat-Liebsteinský

During the 17th century, many major changes took place. For the Kolowrat family, among the most important of events was the promotion of the family to Counts of the Holy Roman Empire and Counts of Bohemia. In 1629, a family agreement was concluded between the male members of all branches of the family, in which the indivisibility of the property, the maintenance of the monastery in Dolní Ročov, preservation of the Coat of arms and the ancestral history, and the non-mixing of ancestral noble blood were negotiated. Many members became major patrons, primarily of the Catholic Church. Count Franz Karel I. (1620–1700), knight of the Order of the Golden Fleece, financially supported the construction of many church buildings throughout his life. In 1674, he founded an entailed estate consisting of Rychnov nad Kněžnou, Cernikovice, and Borohrádek. Count Oldřich František (1607–1650) was present at the establishment of the Capuchin monastery in Sušice, supported the founding of the Jesuit college in Klatovy, in Březnice and in Hlohov. Count Kryštof Jaroslav (1604–1659) provided extensive repairs of the Augustinian monastery in Dolní Ročov between 1647 and 1648. Count Václav (1634–1659) is considered the greatest patron of the entire family, because in 1654 he renounced the entire estate and devoted it to the construction of the St. Nicholas cathedral in Malá Strana in Prague . After the departure of French troops from the country, Count Maximilian Norbert (1660–1721), provided financial assistance to repair the Jesuit college, grammar school and seminary in Klatovy. Worth noting is also the last wife of Count Wilhelm Albrecht I (1600–1688), Countess Ludmila Eva Františka (1616–1695), who in 1691 donated her diamond-studded wedding dress (6500 diamonds) to the Prague Loreta, from which the Diamond Monstrance, also known as the Prague Sun, was made. Count Jan Wilhelm Vojtěch (1627–1668) dedicated his life to his ecclesiastical career, and was a canon several times over and a prelate. In 1668, he even became Archbishop of Prague.

=== 18th century ===
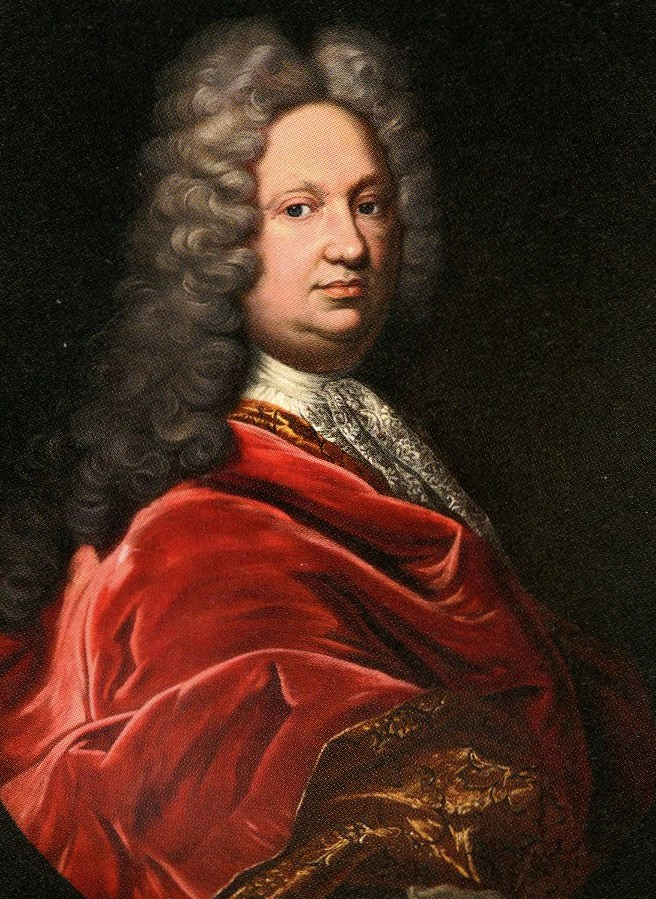
Count Filip Nerius (Neri) Krakowský of Kolowrat

In the 18th century, many Kolowrats become members of prestigious orders. Several of them even received the most prestigious Habsburg order, the Order of the Golden Fleece. One of its recipients was Count Norbert Leopold (1655–1711), who was a lifelong supporter of the Catholic Church and Empress Eleonor. When the Karlštejn Castle was for sale, Count Norbert Leopold bought it for 150,000 gold and donated it back to the Crown as he believed that Karlštejn Castle should not be in private hands. Another knight of the Order of the Golden Fleece was Count Filip Nerius (1686–1773), the Supreme Burgrave ( equivalent to prime minister) of the Czech kingdom and a provincial judge. He also founded one of the family tombs. Another family member to receive recognition was Count Leopold Wilhelm (1727–1809), who was also awarded the Grand Cross of the Hungarian Order of St. Stephan and the Order of Leopold. He served as the First State and Conference Minister and the highest Czech-Austrian Chancellor, but he was also a capable entrepreneur in the tobacco and needle industries. Field marshal General and Commander of Bohemia, Count Johann Kollowrat (1748–1816), who fought against Napoleon, also achieved recognition when he was awarded the Grand Cross of the Order of Leopold (Austrian Imperial Order of Leopold), the French Legion of Honour and the Military Order of Maria Theresa. He later became a Commander of the Order of the Knights of Malta. Kajetán František (1689–1769), too, became a Field Marshal General and Military Commander of Moravia. Emanuel Václav (1700–1769), who, among other things, was Grand Prior of the Order of the Knights of Malta, became a general, lieutenant field marshal, and owner of the "Kolowrat" Regiment (the Kolowrat family private army). We should also mention Count Wilhelm Albrecht II, The High Chancellor of the Czech Kingdom, who took over the inheritance after the Barons of Újezd family, which provided him with many estates, including Březnice na Příbram, which remained in the possession of the Kolowrat family for a long time.

=== 19th century ===
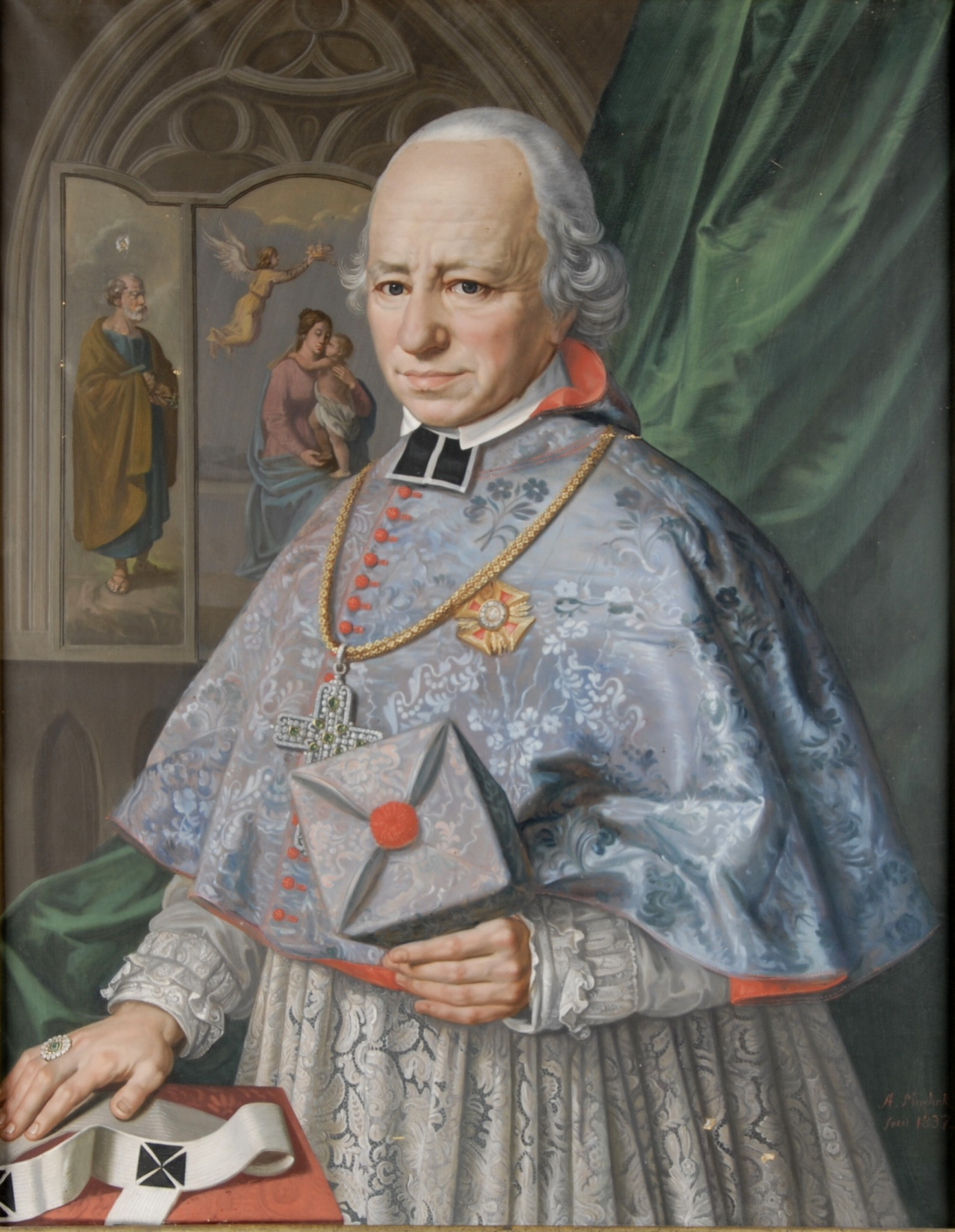
Count Alois Josef Krakowský of Kolowrat, Baron of Újezd, and Archbishop of Prague

The most important politician of the Kolowrat family was Count Franz Anton II. (1778–1861), who became the first Minister-President of the Austrian Empire, the de facto second in command after Emperor Ferdinand I. He later became one of the founders of the Czech National Gallery, donating his extensive collection of paintings. Together with Josef Maria (1746–1824) and Jan Nepomuk Karel (1794–1872), he was also one of the founders of the Czech National Museum, to which he donated, among other things, a library with rare prints and a collection of minerals. Many members of the family played an important role in the Czech National Revival in order to support the unity of the Czech nation. Count Jan Nepomuk Karel (called Hanuš), a knight of the Order of the Knights of Malta, also donated his collections and the Březnice library with many rare incunabula and illuminated manuscripts to the museum. He also did not neglect to support Czech authors, financially supporting Božena Němcova and Karel Havlíček Borovský. He also contributed one of the largest amounts to the building of the National Theater. Even in this period, there were members of the family who set out on a political or military career path. Vincenc Maria (1749–1824), a knight of the Order of the Golden Fleece and many other honors, became the Grand Prior of the Knights of Malta, and in his military career he achieved the rank of Commanding General and lieutenant field marshal. It was in this rank that he commanded the 4th Russian-Austrian Infantry Column of 16,000 men at the Battle of Austerlitz on December 2, 1805, when his army fought against Emperor Napoleon Bonaparte. Count Franz Xaver II. (1803–1873) also became the Grand Prior of the Order of the Knights of Malta and was awarded the Imperial Order of Leopold. He is known primarily because of his post as ambassador at the Imperial Court. Count Leopold Maria (1804–1863) dedicated his entire life to a military career, becoming a Lieutenant Field Marshal and Commanding General. He later became the governor of Venice. Let us also not forget the clergy, and mention Count Alois Josef (1759–1833), Deputy Bishop of Olomouc, Bishop of Hradec Králové and Archbishop of Prague from 1830.

=== 20th century ===
Standing out among others in the 20th century is film producer, founder of the Austrian film industry, automobile and motorcycle racer Count Alexander Joseph (1886–1927), whom everyone simply called Sasha. He was the holder of the Franz Joseph Cross of Merit. During World War I he was the chief of film propaganda for the Austro-Hungarian Empire. After the War, he financially supported Laurin & Klement, even becoming a co-owner of the company, financially backing some of their automotive factories. He also collaborated with Ferdinand Porsche who built him a light-weight sports car called the Sascha Wagen (in honor of Count Alexander). Count Alexander Kolowrat also discovered actress Marlene Dietrich and director Michael Curtiz (famous for Casablanca). His younger brother, Jindřich Josef (1897–1996), was a prominent politician, diplomat, national economist, anti-Nazi fighter and patron in the spirit of the Kolowrat ancestral tradition. He received many honors and awards for both his political activities as well as his lifelong work. Other family holders of state awards include Bohuslav (1876–1934), Jan (1879–1955), and Zdeňek (1881–1941).

== Family descendants ==
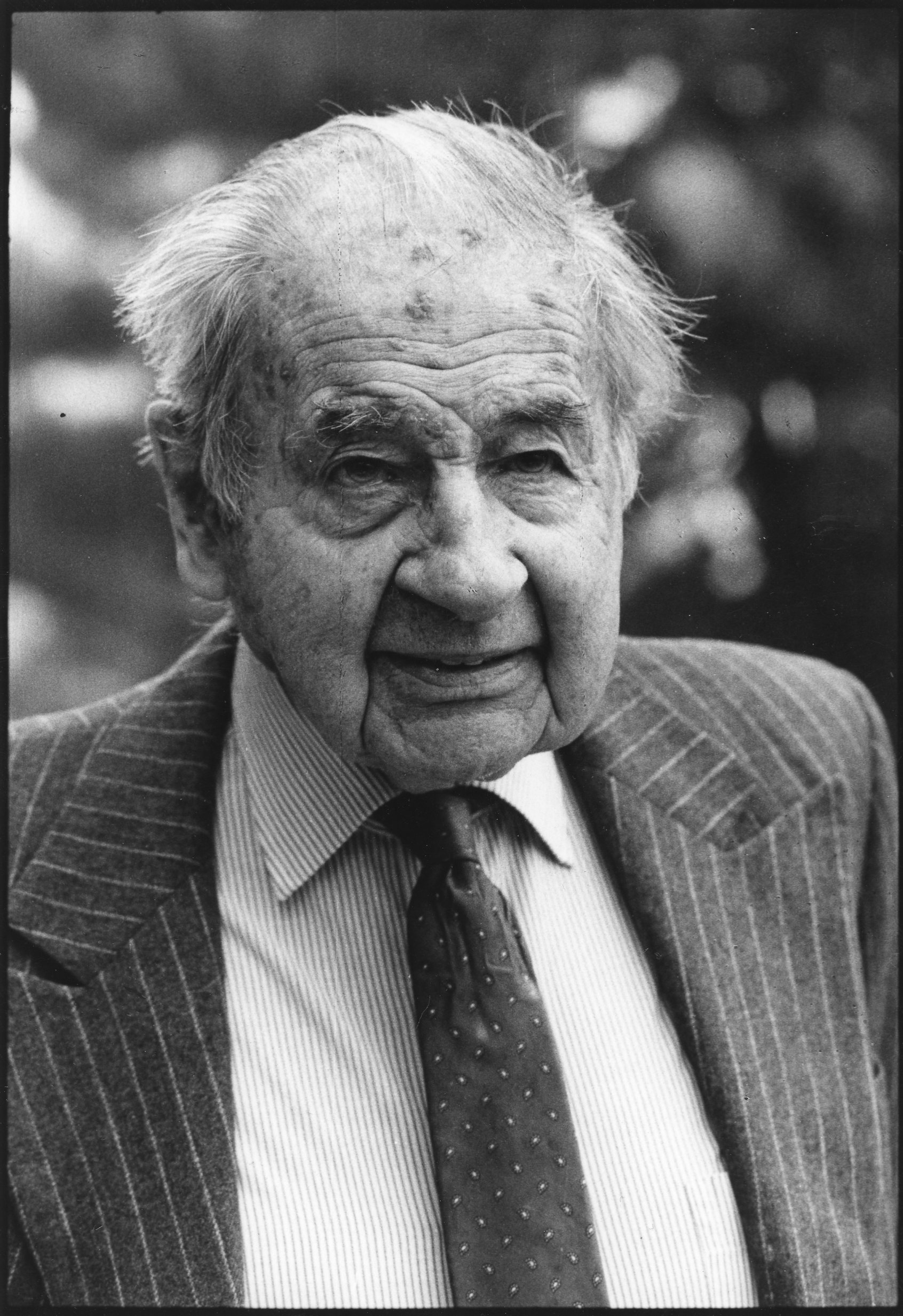
Count Henry Josef Wilhelm Albrecht Pavel Krakowský of Kolowrat

After 1989, Count Jindřich Kolowrat returned from exile to Czechoslovakia, accompanied by his youngest son Count František Tomáš (1943–2004), so that together they could restitute the family property. After the return of the family property, he leased the Kolowrat Palace to the National Theater for the symbolic price of 1 CZK for the duration of 20 years making him one of the greatest supporters of Czech arts. Also in April 1992, pursuant to the Restitution Act, the castle in Rychnov nad Kněžnou, including its collections, the chateau in Černíkovice, lands, were returned to Count Kryštof Jaroslav Kolowrat-Krakowský-Liebsteinský, who managed them until 1999. The properties are now under the administration of his son, Jan Egon. Count Jindřich died in 1996 and appointed Count František Tomáš as the sole heir and administrator of the family property. František Tomáš established a family with JUDr. Dominika Kolowrat-Krakowská, née Perutková, and their son, Count Maxmilian Alexander was born in 1996. Two years later, they welcomed their daughter, Francesca Dominika (*1998). After the premature passing of Count František Tomáš in 2004, Dominika Kolowrat-Krakowská took over the administration of the family assets. Together with her children, Count Maximilian and Francesca, on February 26, 2008 (the 65th anniversary of the birth of František Tomáš), she established the Kolowrátek Endowment Fund.

== Important members ==
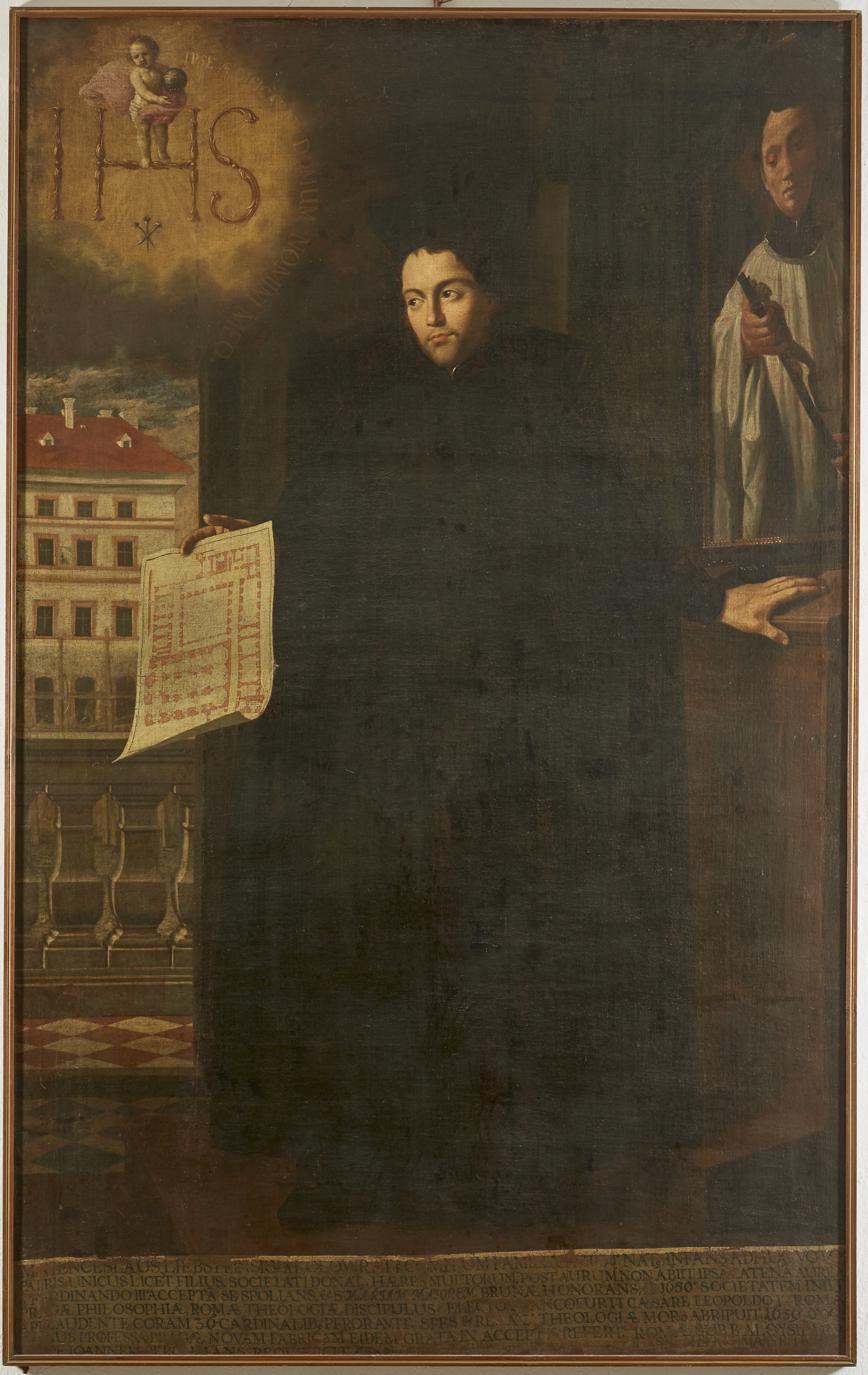
Václav, Count Liebsteinský of Kolowrat (1634–1659)

- Albrecht the older Lord of Kolowraty († 1391), Founder of the St. Augustine's order's monastery in Dolni Rocov
- Albrecht the younger Lord of Kolowraty (mentioned 1369–1416), Co-founder of the Augustinian monastery in Dolni Rocov
- Hanuš I. Lord of Kolowrat (1390–1450), Governor of the towns of Prague, Intermediary governor of the Kingdom of Bohemia
- Albrecht I. Lord of Kolowrat (mentioned 1422–1470), Associate of the Feudal court
- Hanuš II. Lord of Kolowrat († 1483), Canon of Prague and Vyšehrad, Administrator of the Prague Archdiocese, Sponsor
- Albrecht II. Lord Liebsteinský of Kolowrat (mentioned 1463–1510), Supreme chamberlain, Supreme chancellor of Bohemia
- Jindřich Albrecht Lord of Kolowrat and Krakovec (mentioned 1479–1530), The highest judge of feudal court in Bohemia
- Albrecht II. Lord of Kolowrat (mentioned 1503–1542), Governor of Rakovník region
- Jan Lord Kolowrat-Krakowsky (mentioned 1530–1555), Governor of Rakovnik region
- Kryštof Jindřich Lord Krakowsky of Kolowrat (1549–1596), Governor of Rakovnik region
- Bohuslav Jiří Lord Krakowsky of Kolowrat (1596–1638/41), Chamberlain and Imperial Council
- Vilém Albrecht I. Count Krakowsky of Kolowrat (1600–1688), Chief Feudal judge and chief bailiff of the Czech kingdom, Sponsor
- Kryštof Jaroslav Lord Krakowsky of Kolowrat (mentioned 1604–1659), Imperial Council, Associate of feudal chambre court, Sponsor
- Oldřich František Count Liebsteinský of Kolowrat (1607–1650), The Highest Burgrave, Hofmeister, Chamberlain, Sponsor
- František Karel I. Count Liebsteinský of Kolowrat (1620–1700), Knight of the Order of the Golden Fleece, Provincial governor, President over appeals, Sponsor
- Jan Vilém Vojtěch Count Liebsteinský of Kolowrat (1624–1668), The Archbishop of Prague, Grand master of the Military Order of the Crusaders of the Red Star
- Václav Count Liebsteinský of Kolowrat (1634–1659), Jesuit, Sponsor, Exemplary Canon, Scholar
- Jan František Count Krakowsky of Kolowrat (1649–1723), The Highest Chancellor of the Kingdom of Bohemia, Royal Commissioner

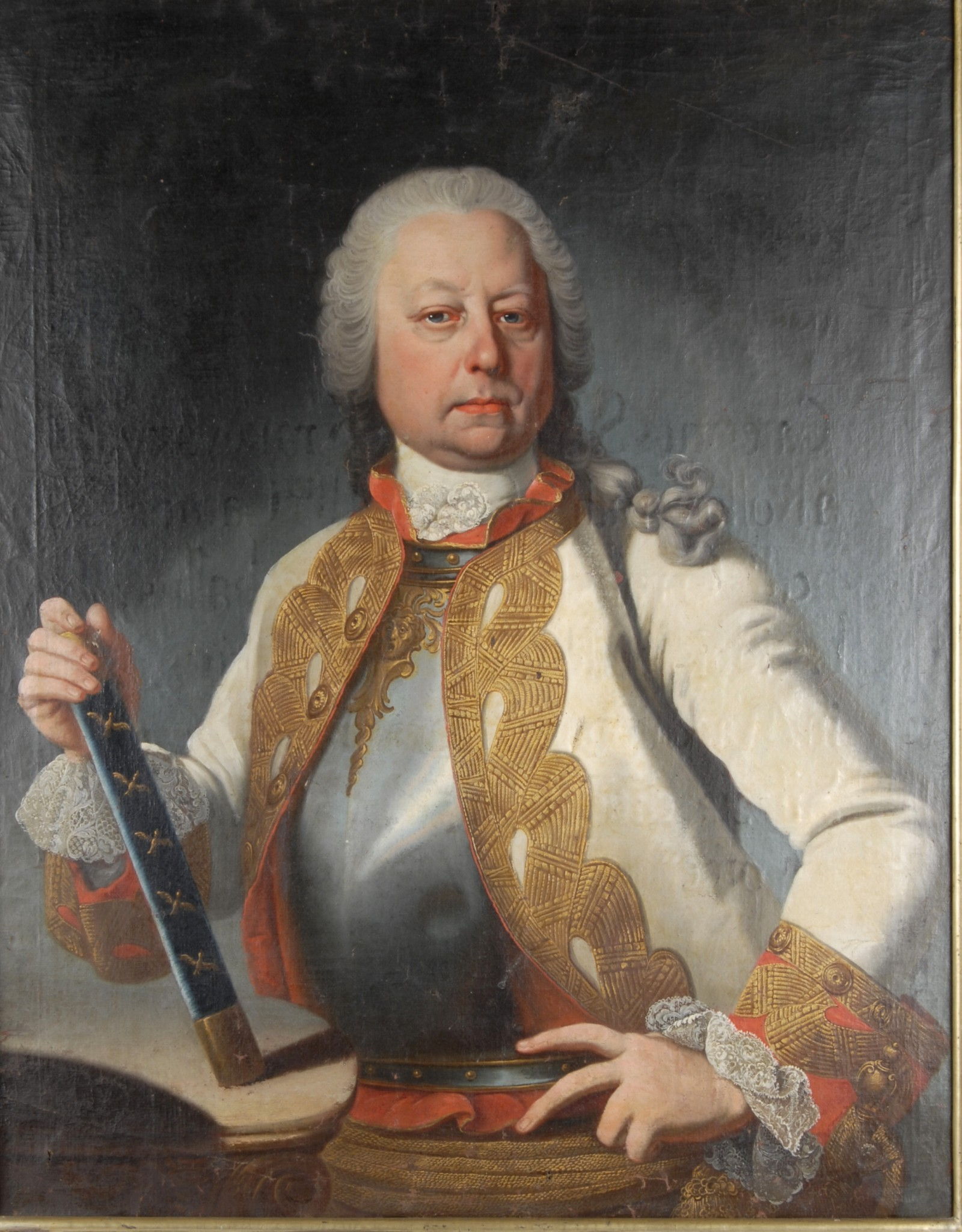
Kajetán František Count Krakowský of Kolowrat (1689–1769)

- Albrecht Jindřich Count Krakowsky of Kolowrat (1655–1704), Governor of the Rakovník region
- Norbert Leopold Count Liebsteinský of Kolowrat (1655–1716), Knight of the Order of the Golden Fleece, Elector in Koln, Sponsor
- Maximilian Norbert Count Krakowsky of Kolowrat (1660–1721), Supreme Provincial Chamberlain, President of the Appellate Council in Bohemia, Sponsor
- Vilém Albrecht II. Count Krakowsky of Kolowrat, Baron of Újezd (1678–1738), The Highest Chancellor of the Bohemian Royal Court
- Filip Nerius (Neri) Count Krakowsky of Kolowrat (1686–1773), Knight of the Golden Fleece, Grand Burgrave, Supreme Judge
- Kajetán František Count Krakowsky of Kolowrat (1689–1769), Field marshal and military commander in Moravia
- Emanuel Václav Kajetán Count Krakowsky of Kolowrat (1700–1769), Cavalry General, The owner of the Kolowrat dragoon regiment, Grand Prior of the Order of Malta
- Prokop Jan Count Krakowsky of Kolowrat, Baron of Újezd (1718–1774), Supreme feudal judge, Supreme Judge in Bohemia
- Leopold Vilém Count Krakowsky of Kolowrat (1727–1809), Knight of the Order of the Golden Fleece, The supreme Czech-Austrian Chancellor, First Minister of State and Conference Minister
- Jan Nepomuk Karel Josef Count Krakowsky of Kolowrat, Baron of Újezd (1748–1816), Commander of the Order of the Knights of Malta, Commanding general in Bohemia, Lieutenant Field Marshal
- Vincent Maria Count Liebsteinsky of Kolowrat (1749–1824), Knight of the Order of the Golden Fleece, Grand Prior of the Order of Malta in Bohemia, Cavalry General, Field Marshal
- Alois Josef Count Krakowsky of Kolowrat, baron of Újezd, (1759–1833), Archbishop of Prague

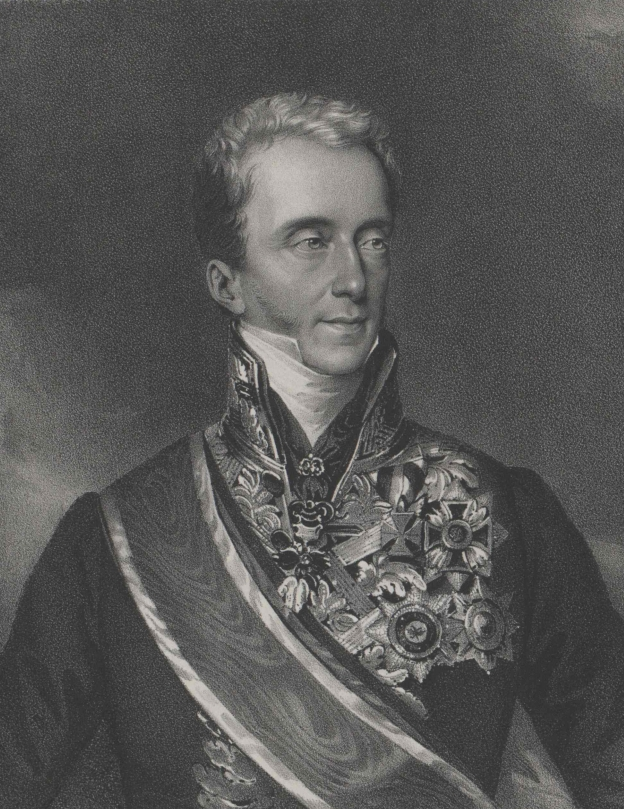
František Antonín II., Count Liebsteinsky of Kolowrat (1778–1861)

- František Antonín II., Count Liebsteinsky of Kolowrat (1778–1861), Knight of the Order of the Golden Fleece, Minister of State and Minister of Conference, Founder of the National Museum in Prague, Sponsor
- František Xaver I. Count Krakowsky of Kolowrat (1783–1855), Chamberlain, Lieutenant-Colonel (Oberstleutnant)
- Jan Nepomuk Karel (called Hanuš) Count Krakowský-Nowohradský of Kolowrat, Baron of Újezd (1794–1872), Honorable Knight of the Order of the Knights of Malta, Chamberlain, Imperial Privy Council, Sponsor
- František Xaver II. Count Krakowsky of Kolowrat (1803–1873), Czech grand prior of the Maltese knights order, The ambassador at the imperial court in Vienna
- Leopold Maria Meinrad Adam Camillo Johann Nepomuk Raimund Count Krakowsky of Kolowrat (1804–1863), Field Marshal, the right hand of Marshal Joseph Radetzky von Radetz
- Leopold Filip Count Krakowsky of Kolowrat (1852–1910), Member of the Imperial Council and the Czech Assembly, Second Class knight of the Order of the Iron Crown
- Alexandr Joseph Count Krakowsky of Kolowrat (1886–1927), Film producer, car and motorcycle racing driver
- Jindřich Josef Vilém Albrecht Pavel Count Krakowsky of Kolowrat (1897–1996), Politician, visionary and restorer of the family estate
- František Sal. Tomáš Karel Count Krakowsky of Kolowrat (1943–2004), continuer of the family property administration

== Family properties ==
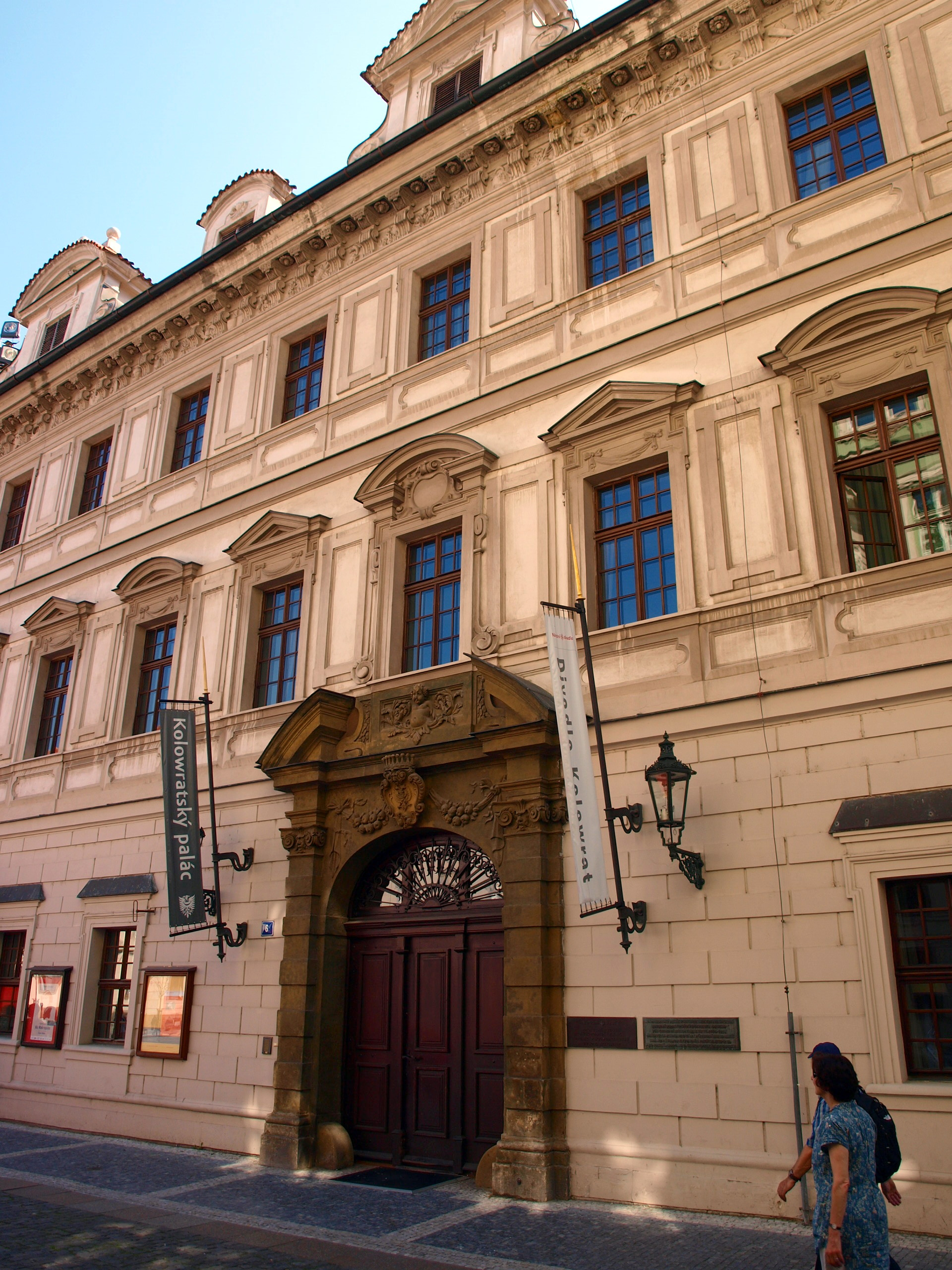
Kolowrat Palace

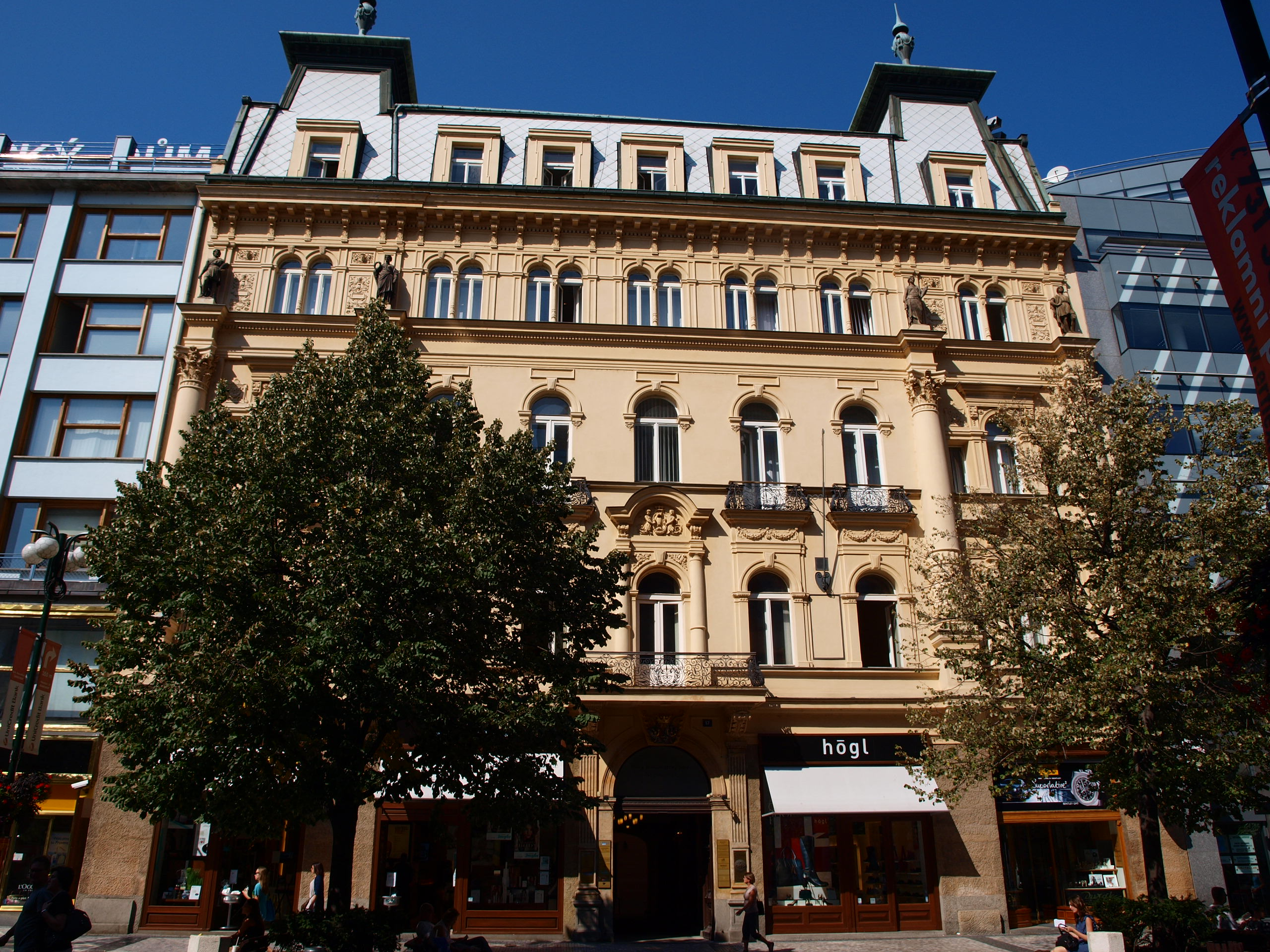
New Kolowrat Palace

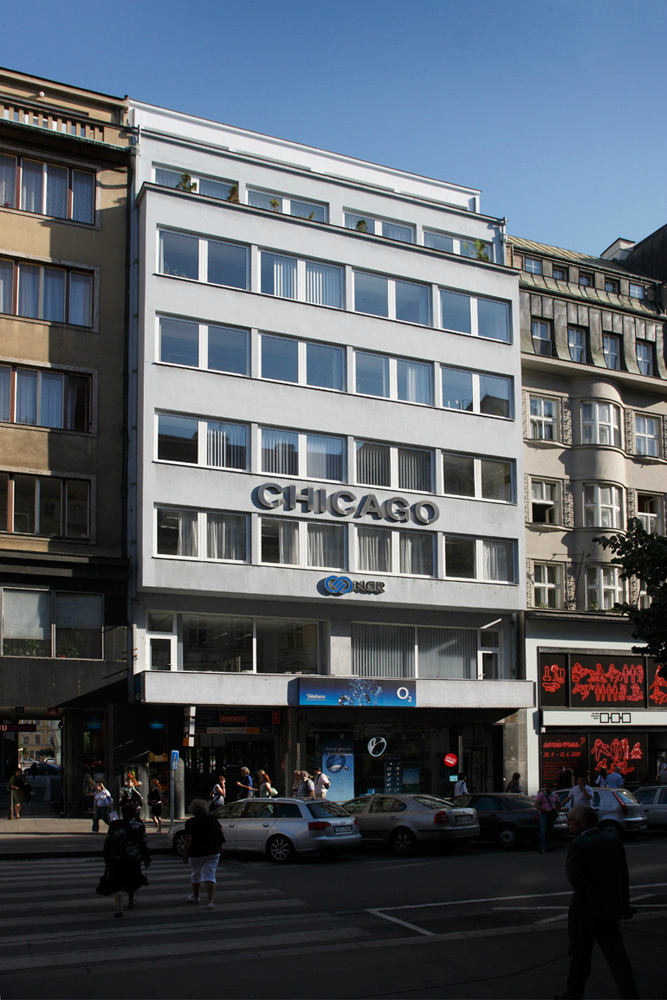
Palace Chicago

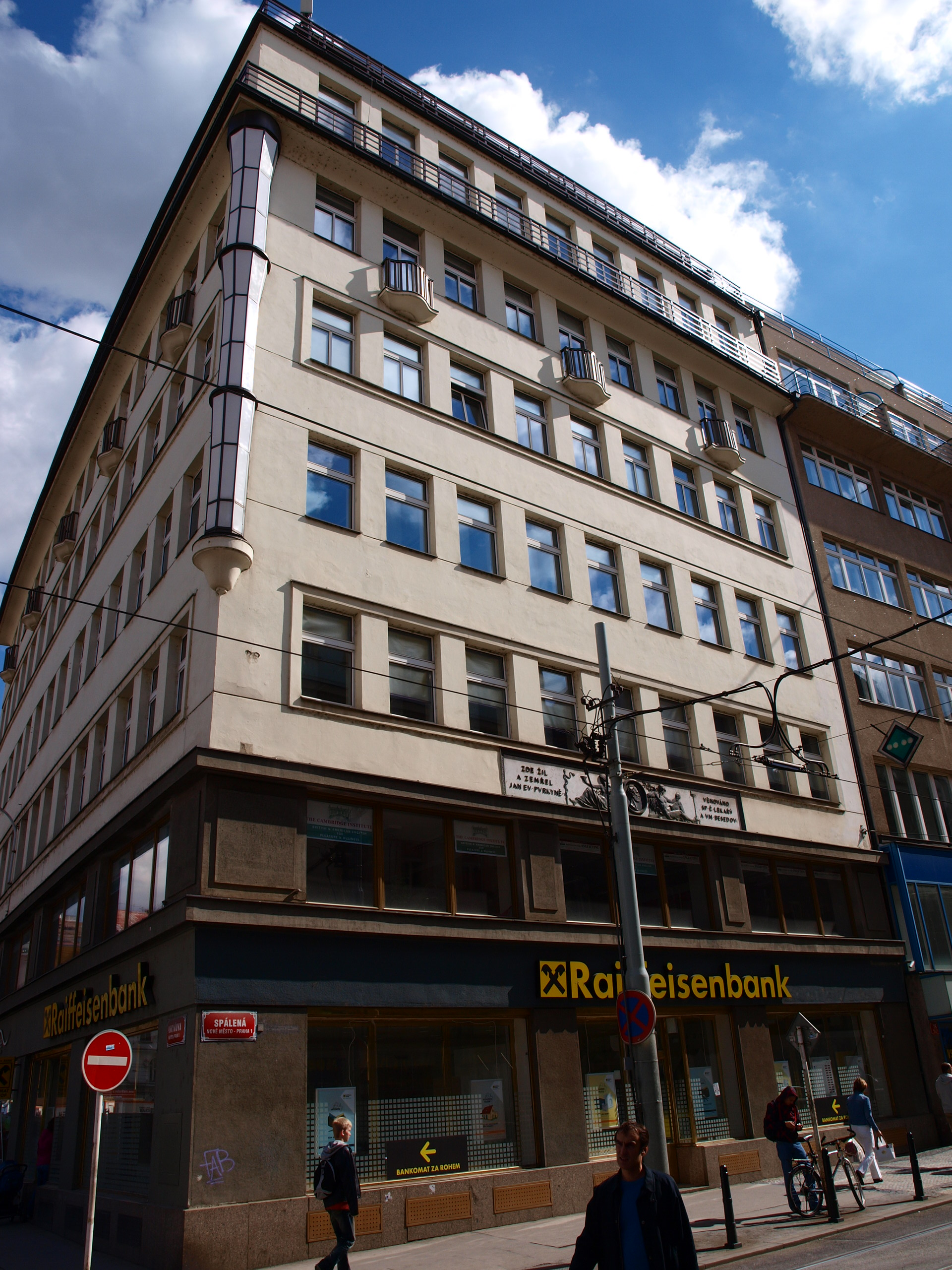
Palace Purkyňova

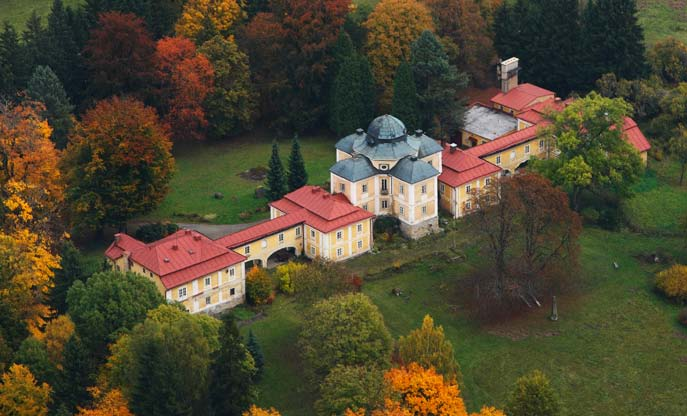
Hunting Castle Diana

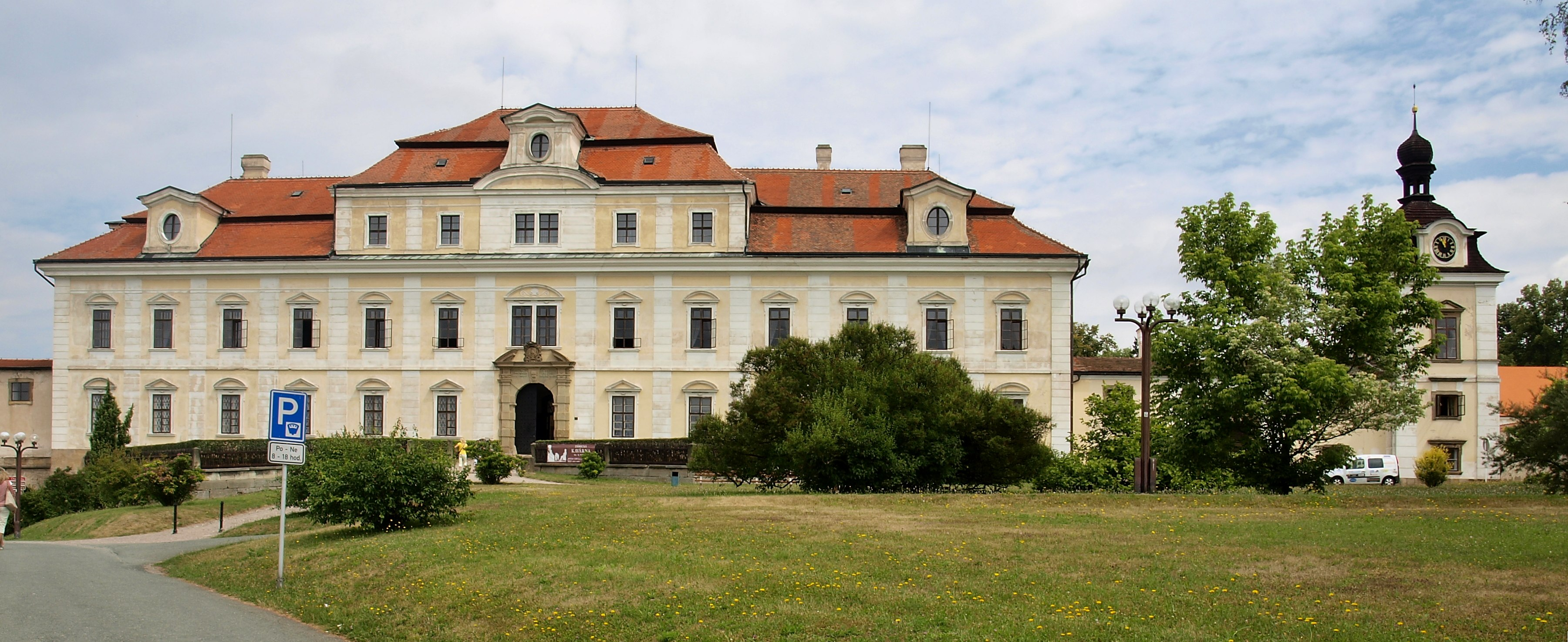
Castle Rychnov nad Kněžnou

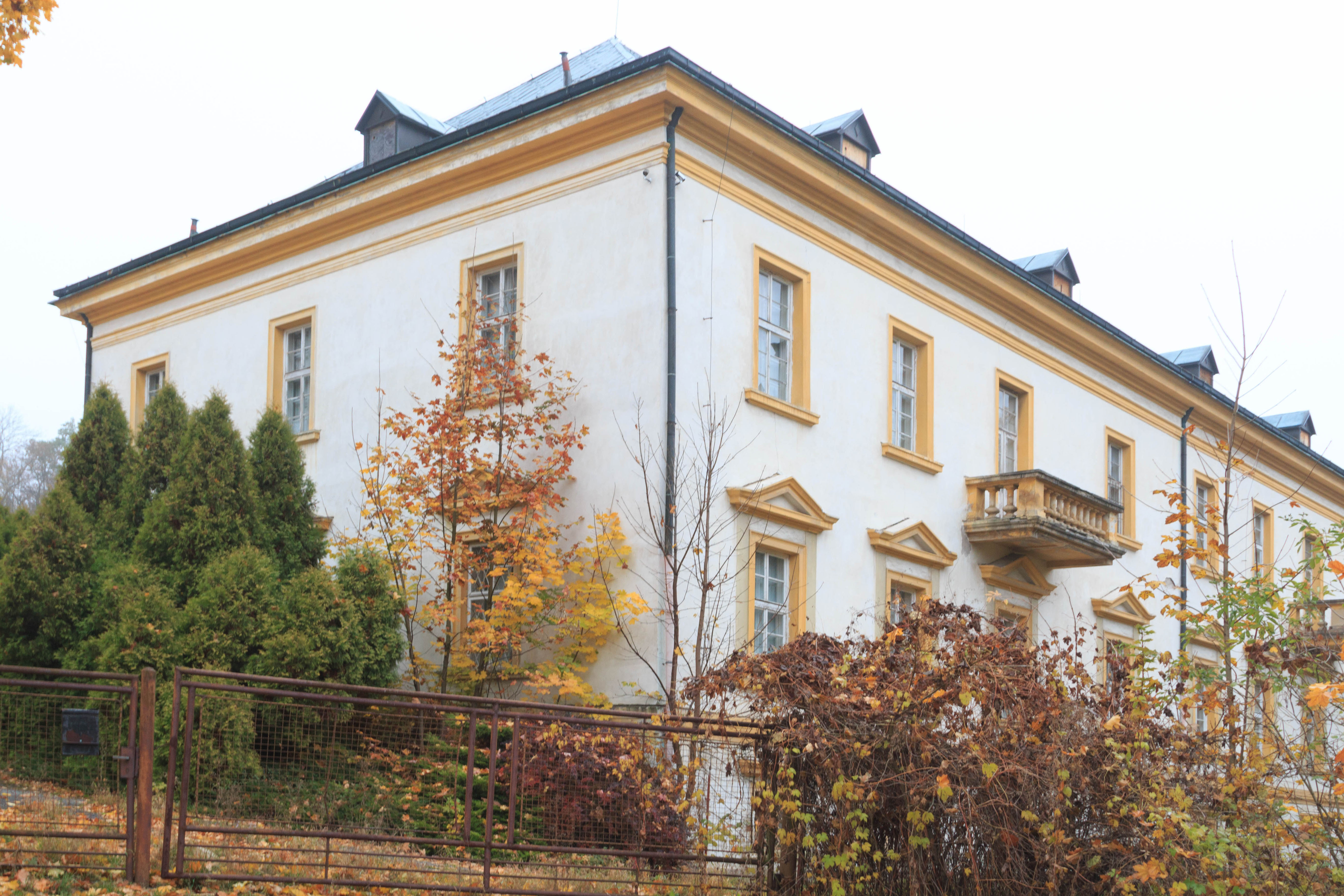
Castle Černíkovice

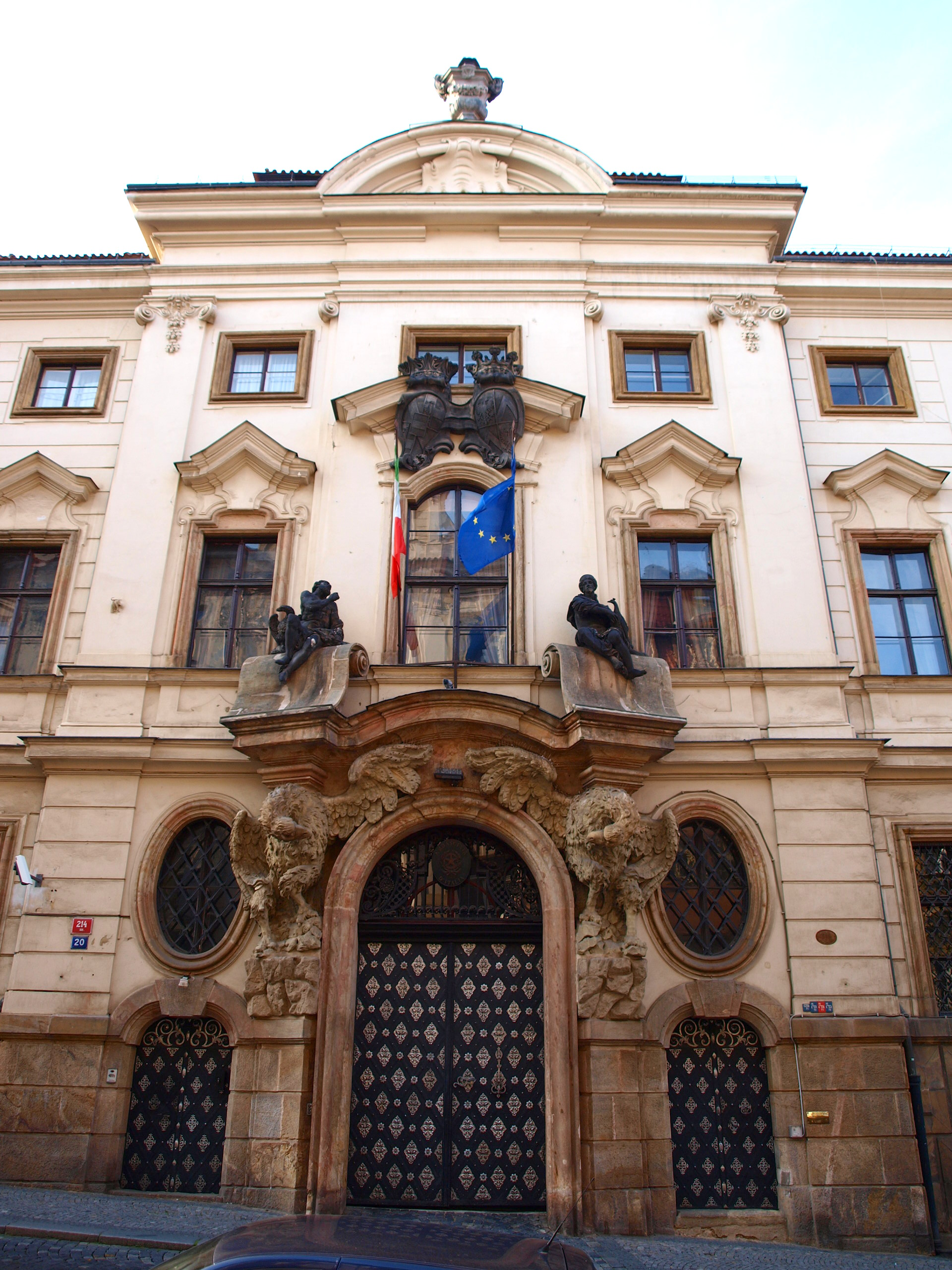
Kolowrat Palace (Prague, Nerudova)

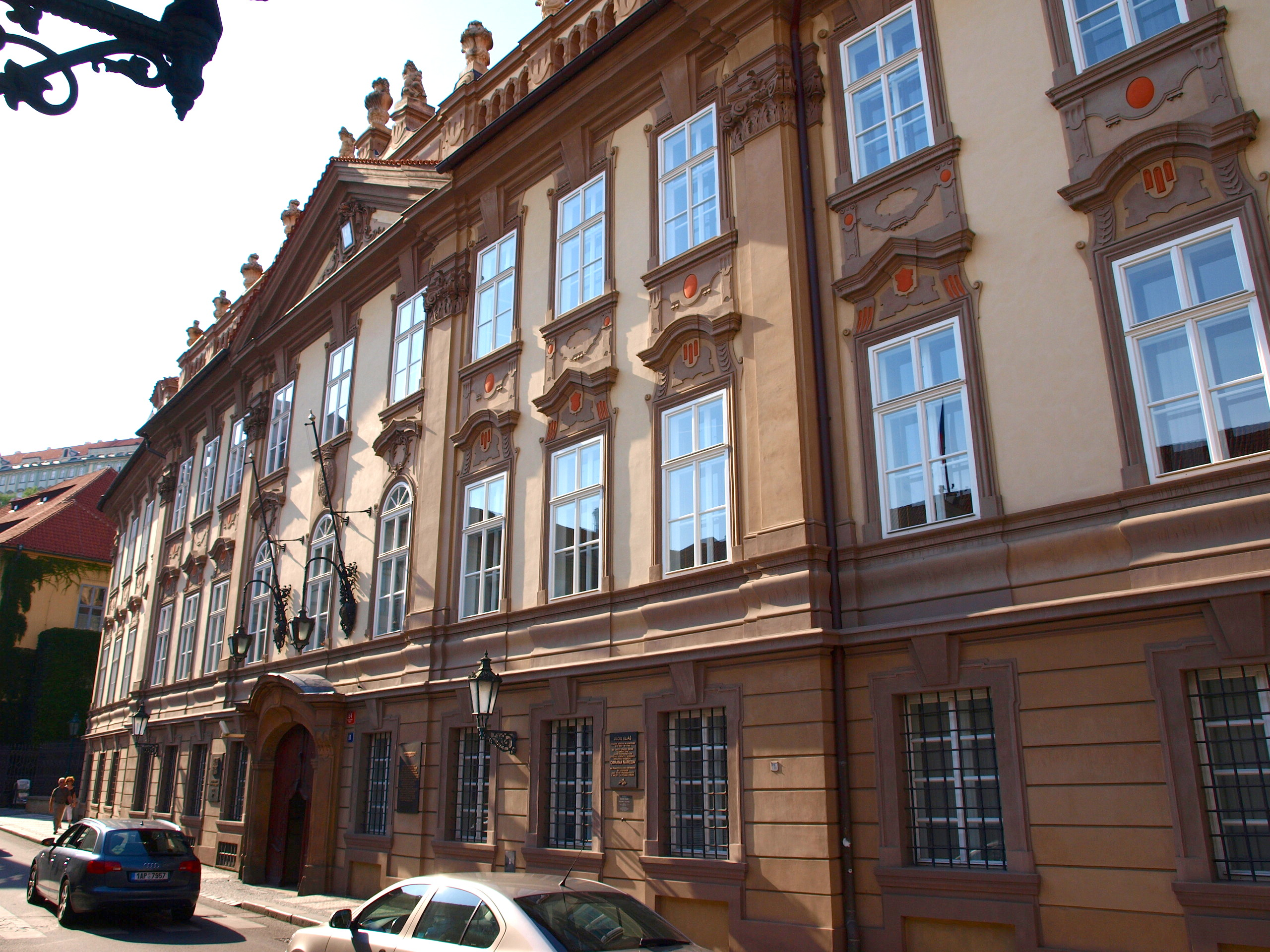
Kolowrat Palace (Prague, Valdštejnská)

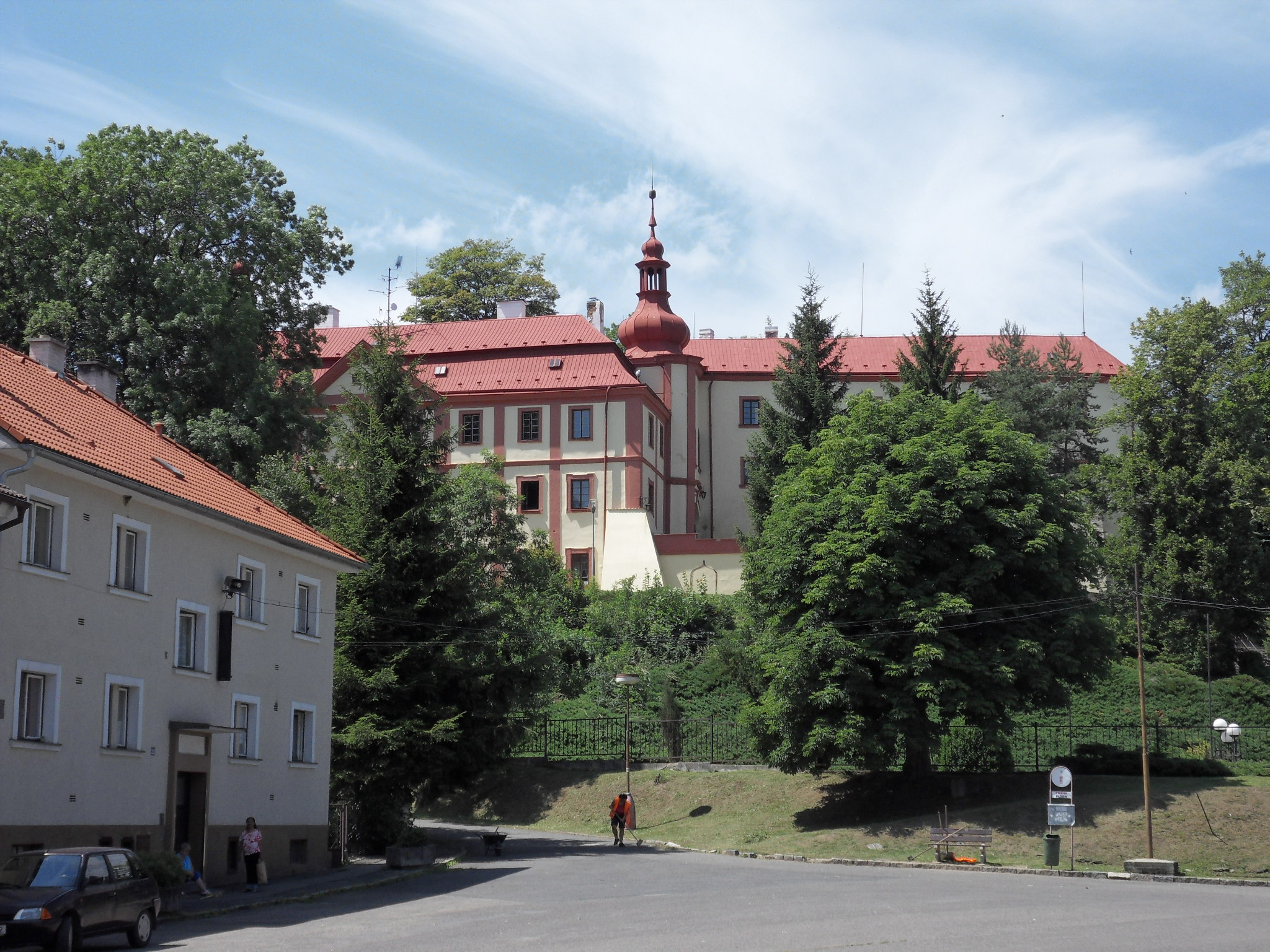
Castle Bezdružice

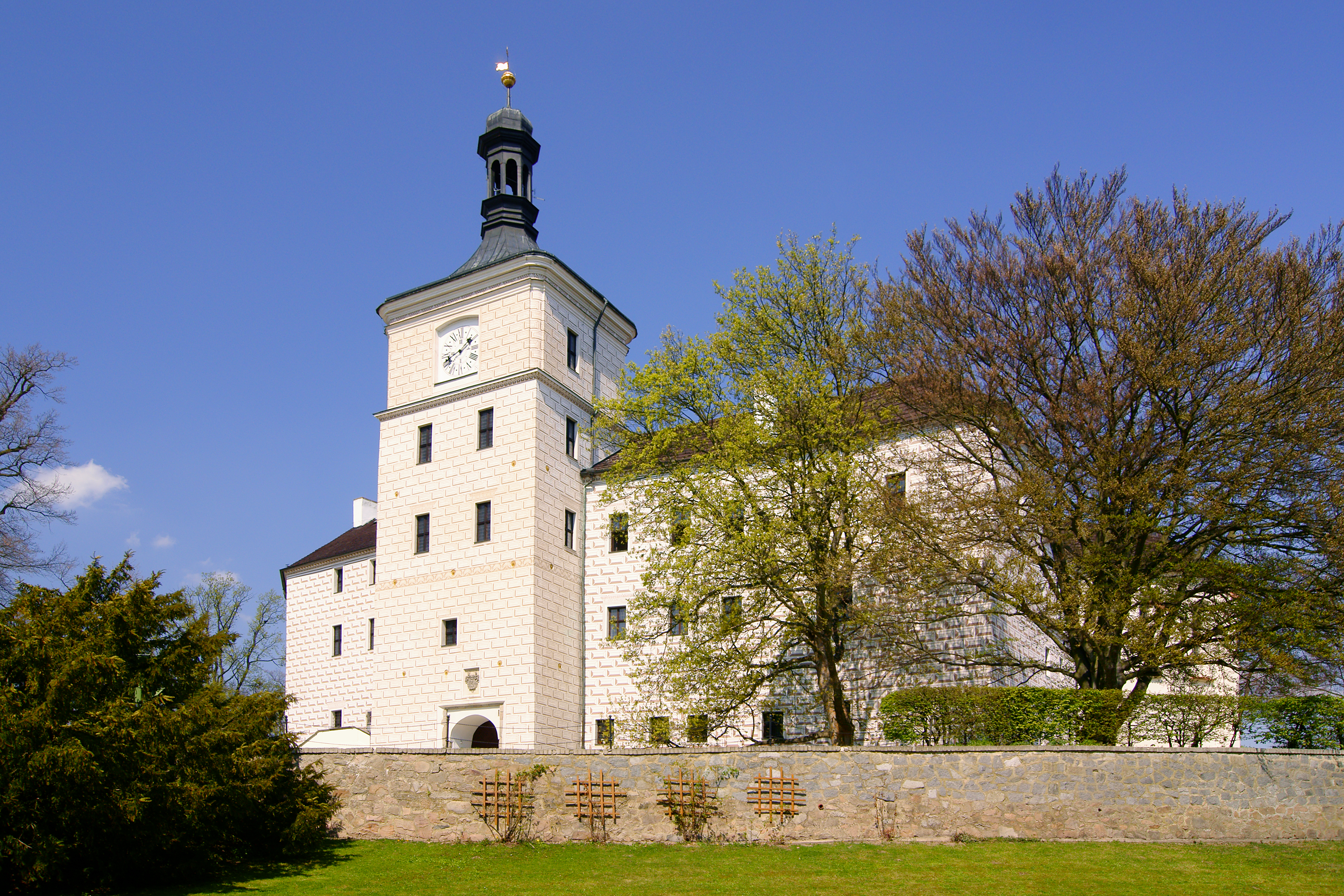
Castle Březnice

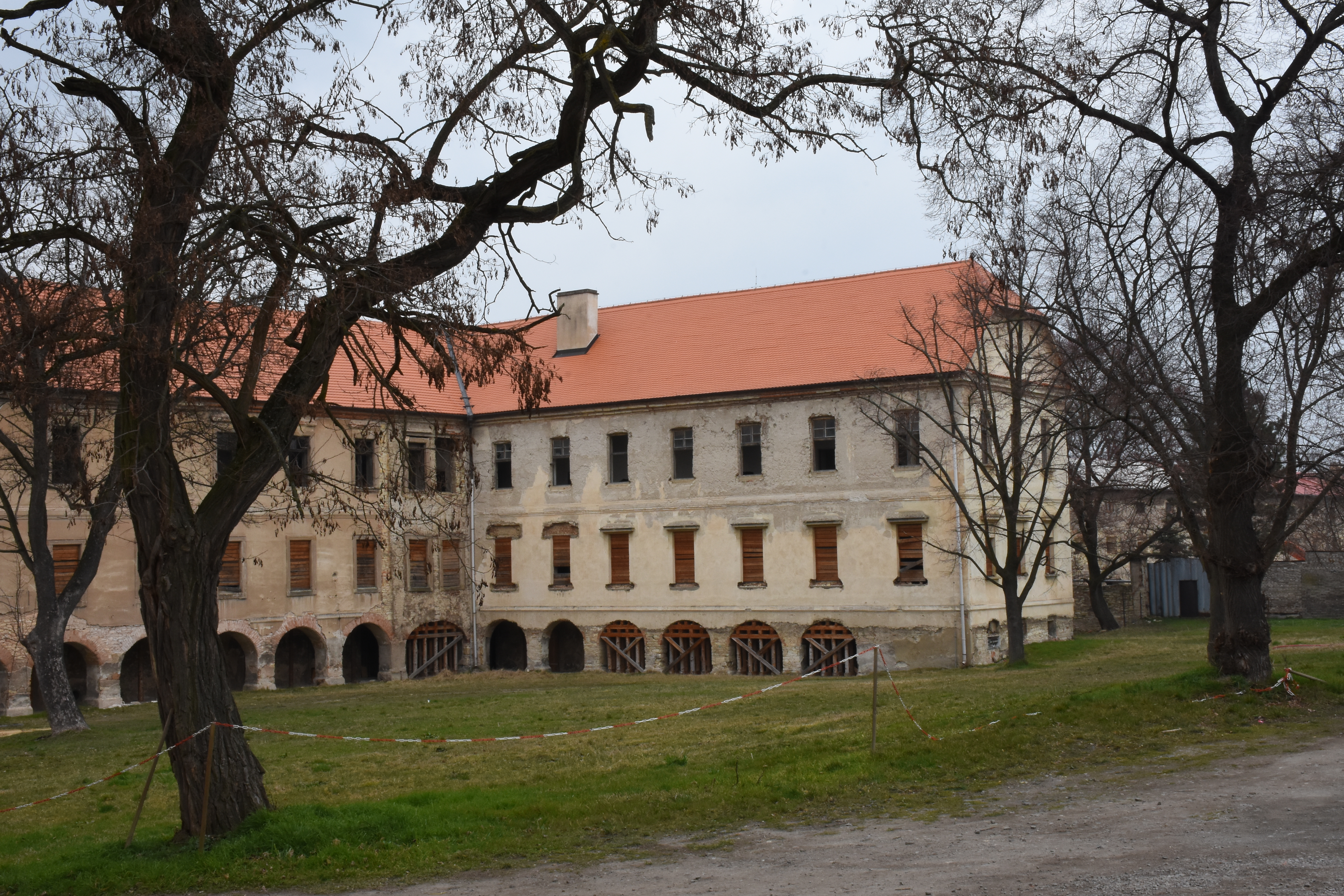
Castle Buštehrad

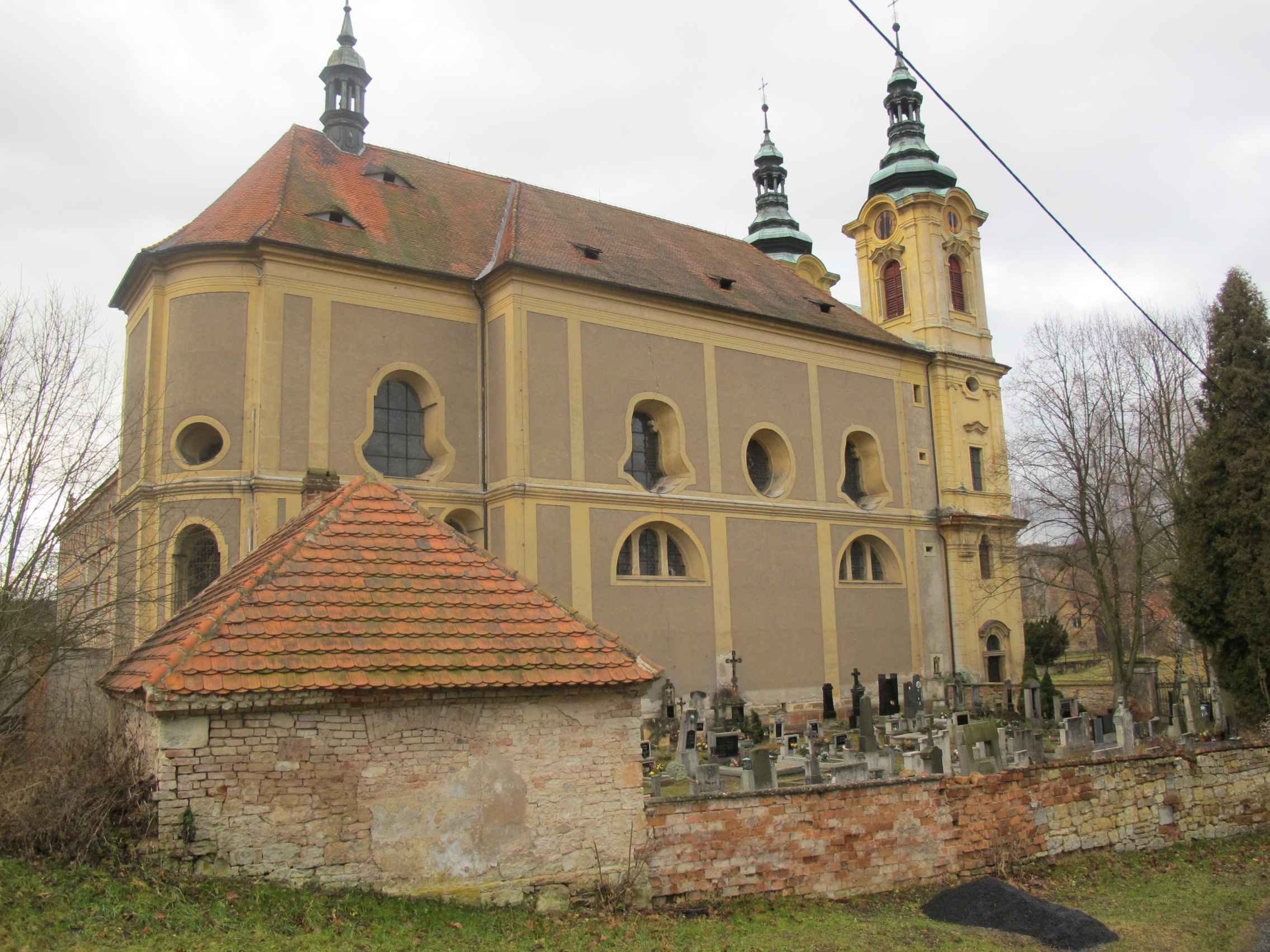
Monastery Dolní Ročov

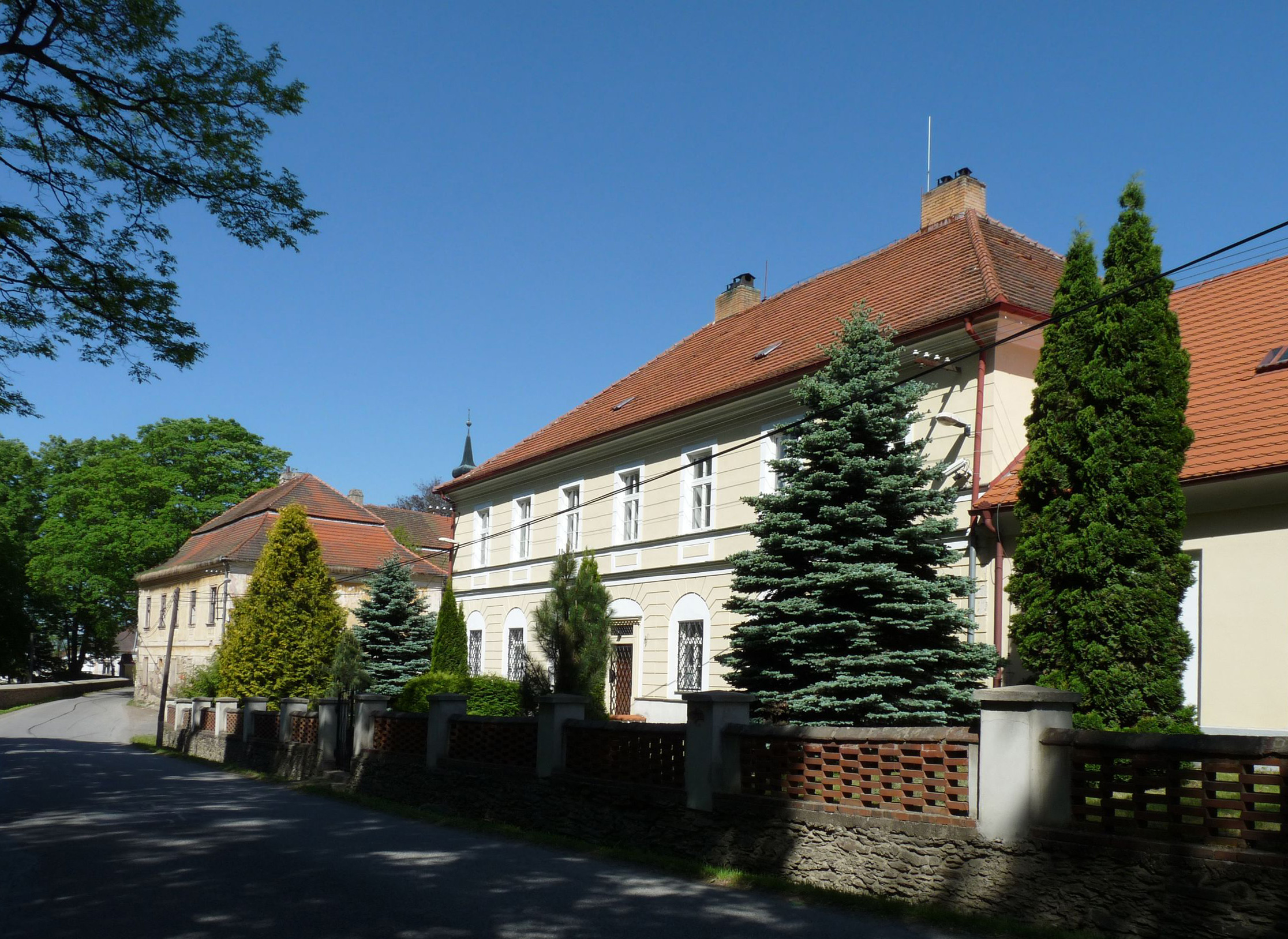
Castle Hroby

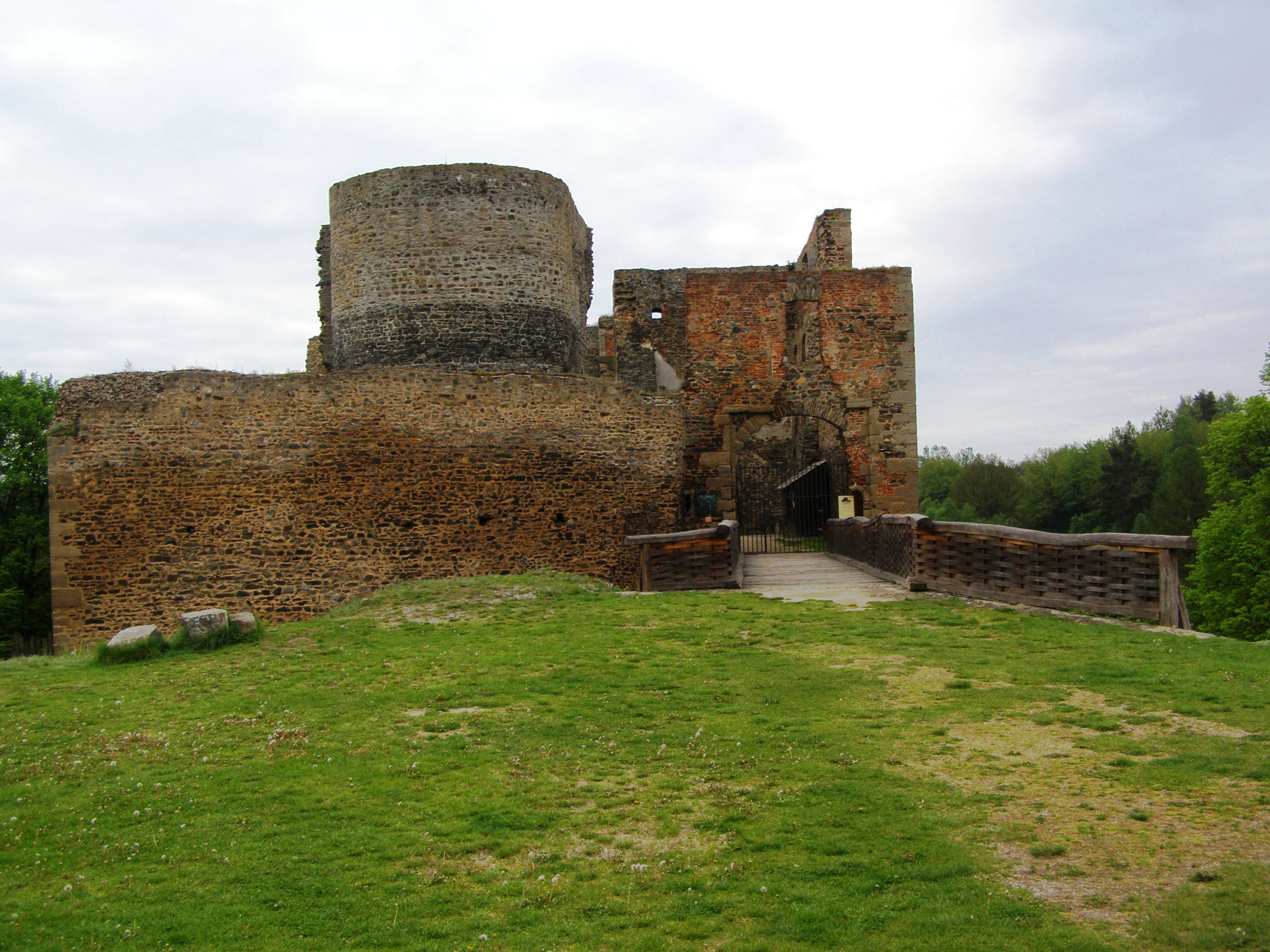
Castle ruins Krakovec

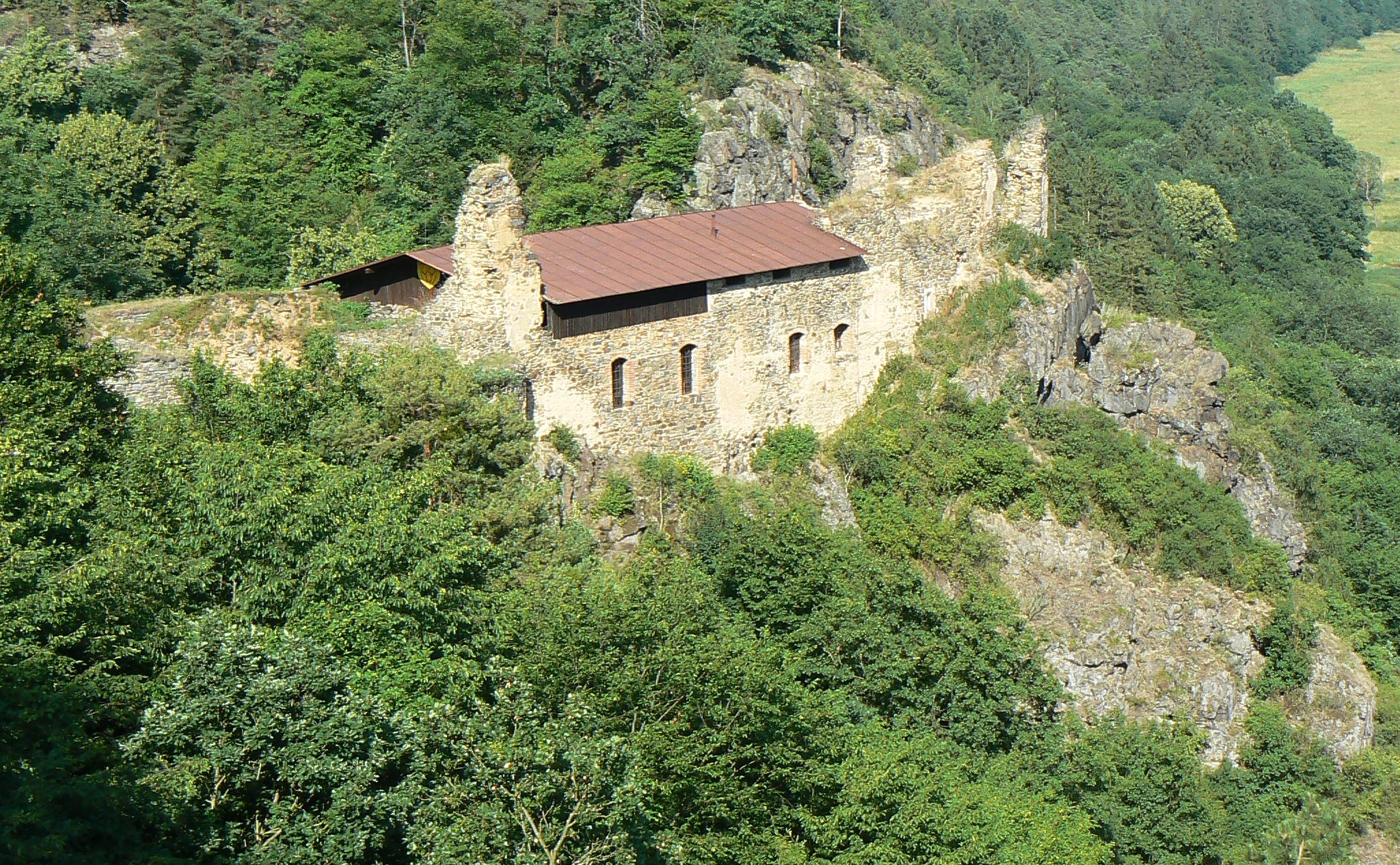
Castle Krašov

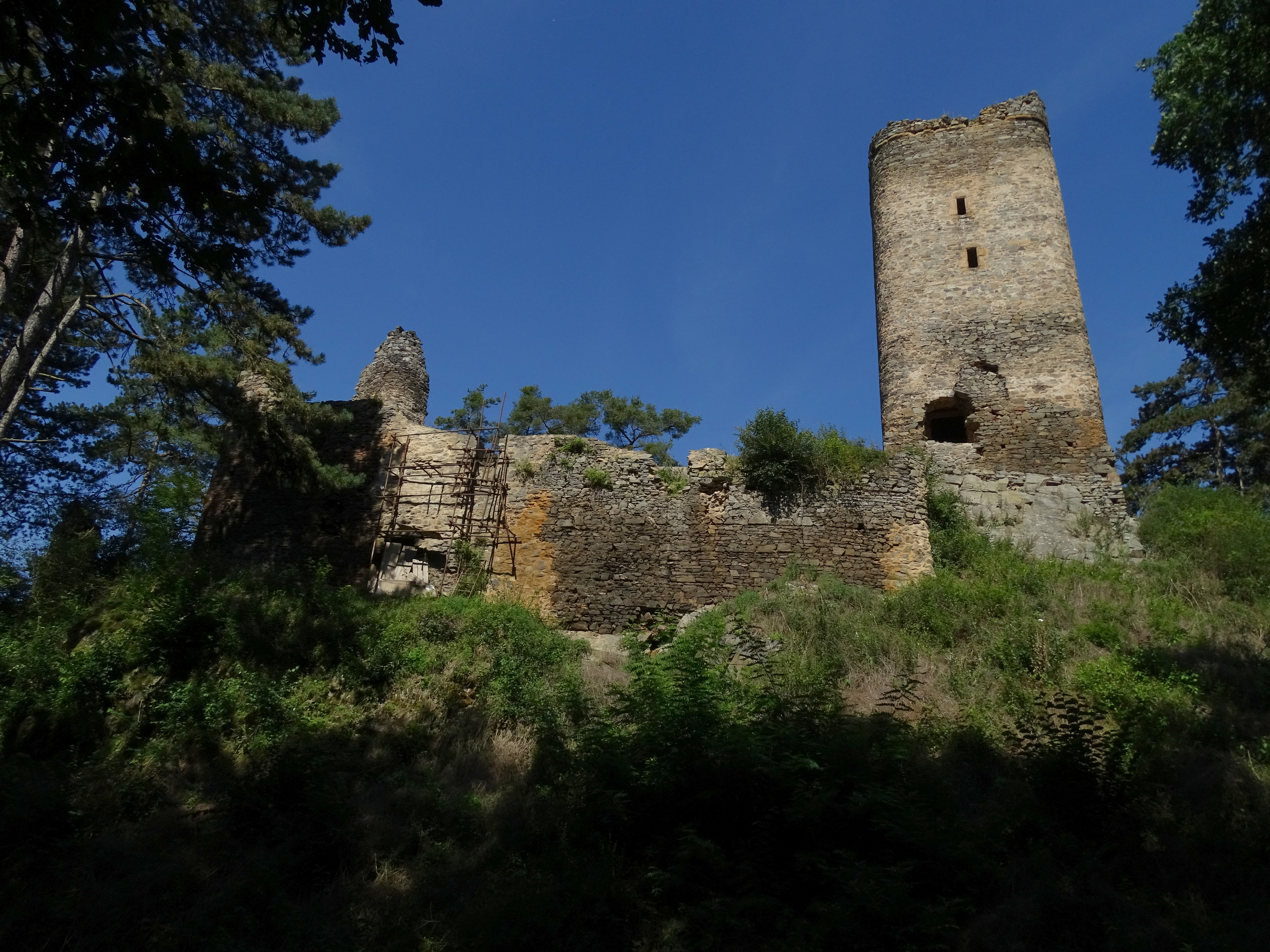
Castle Libštejn

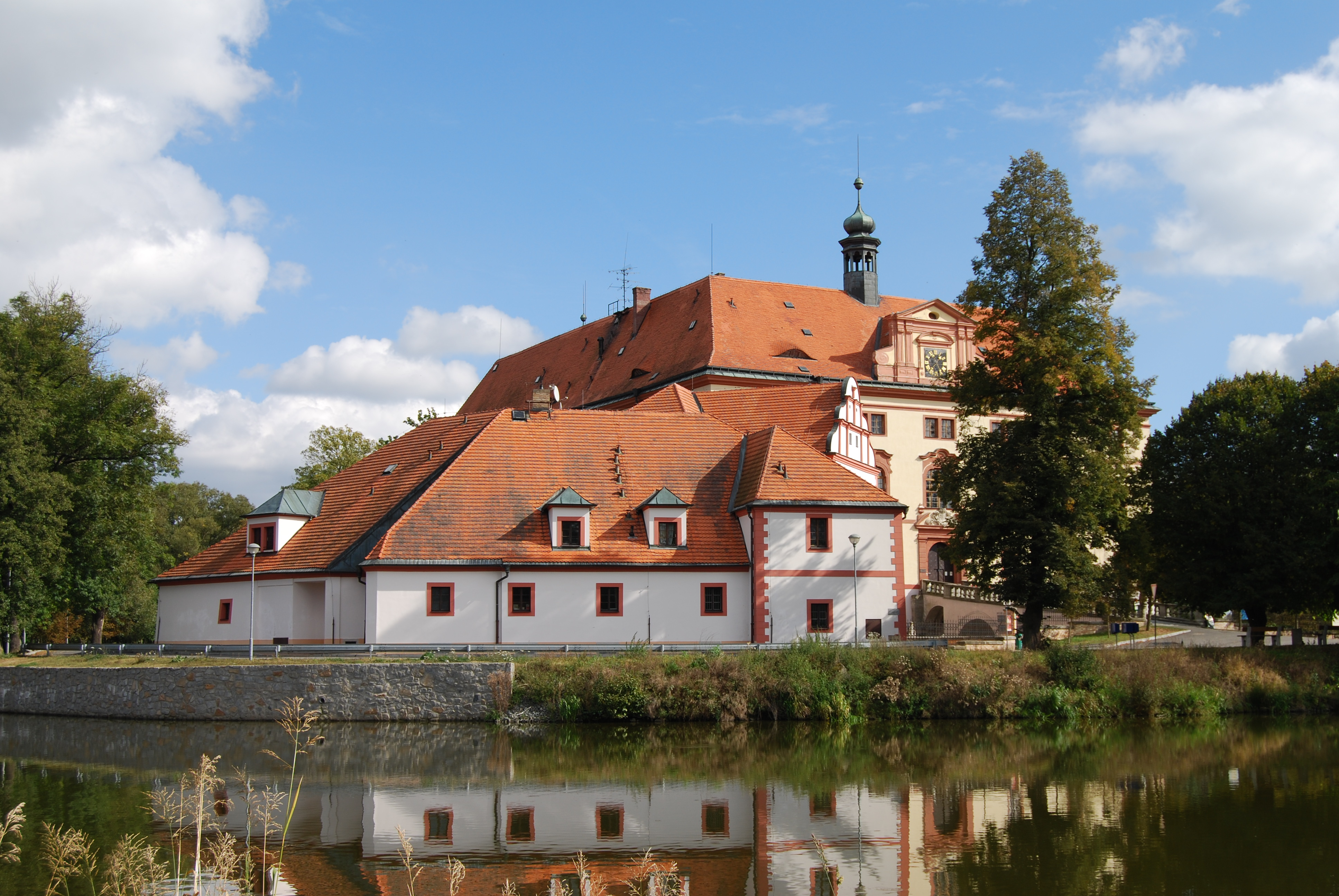
Castle Lnáře

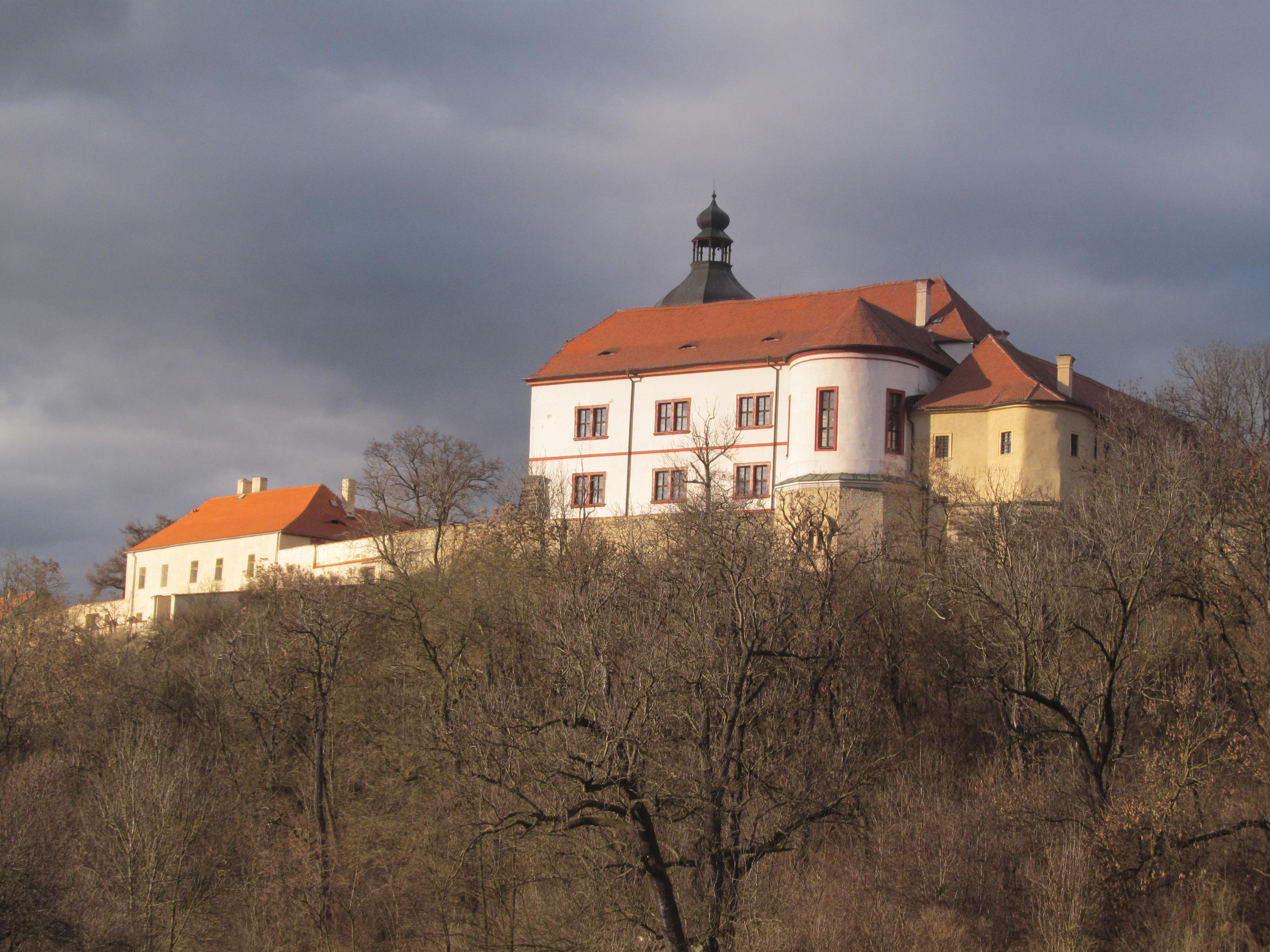
Castle Nový Hrad

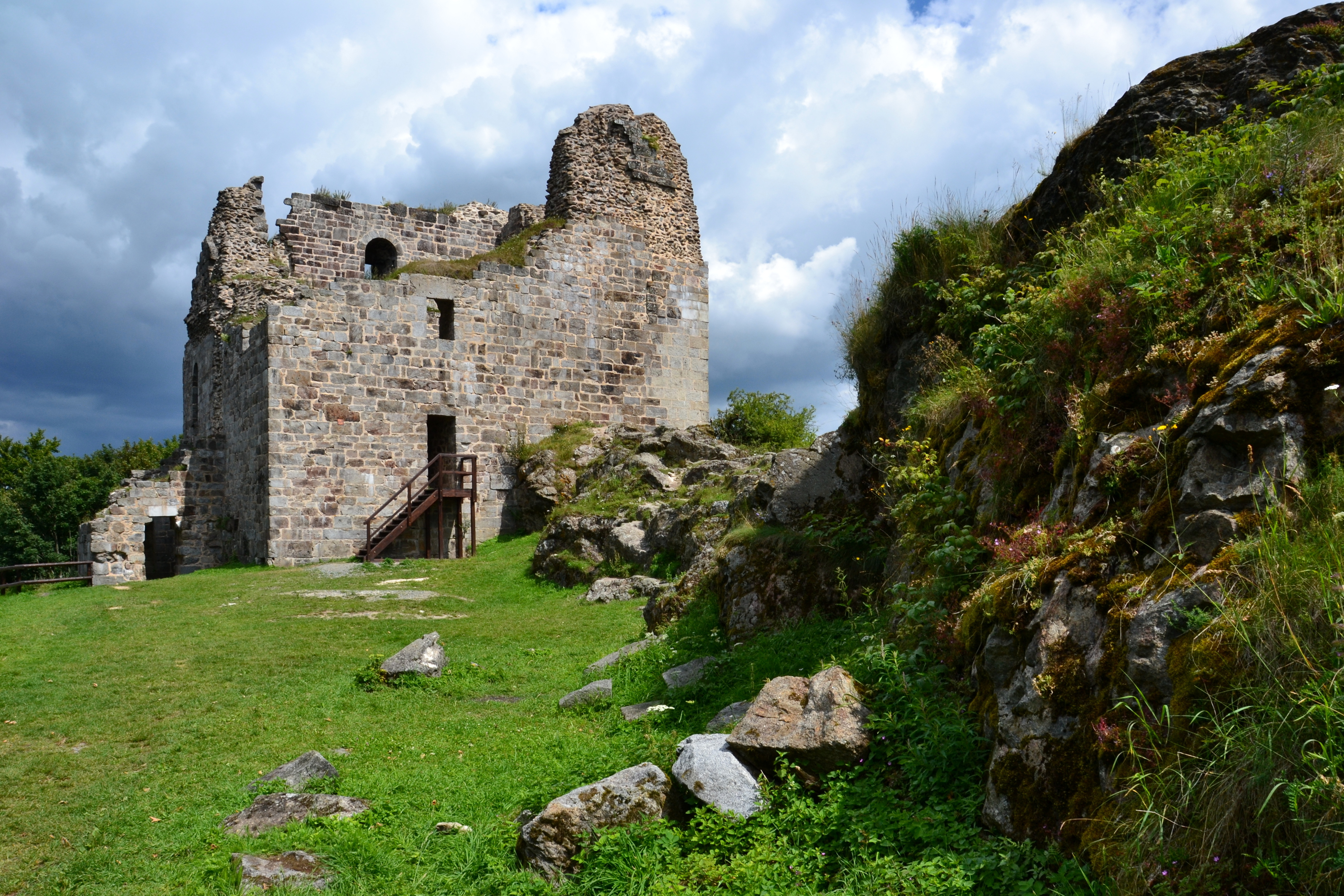
Castle Přimda

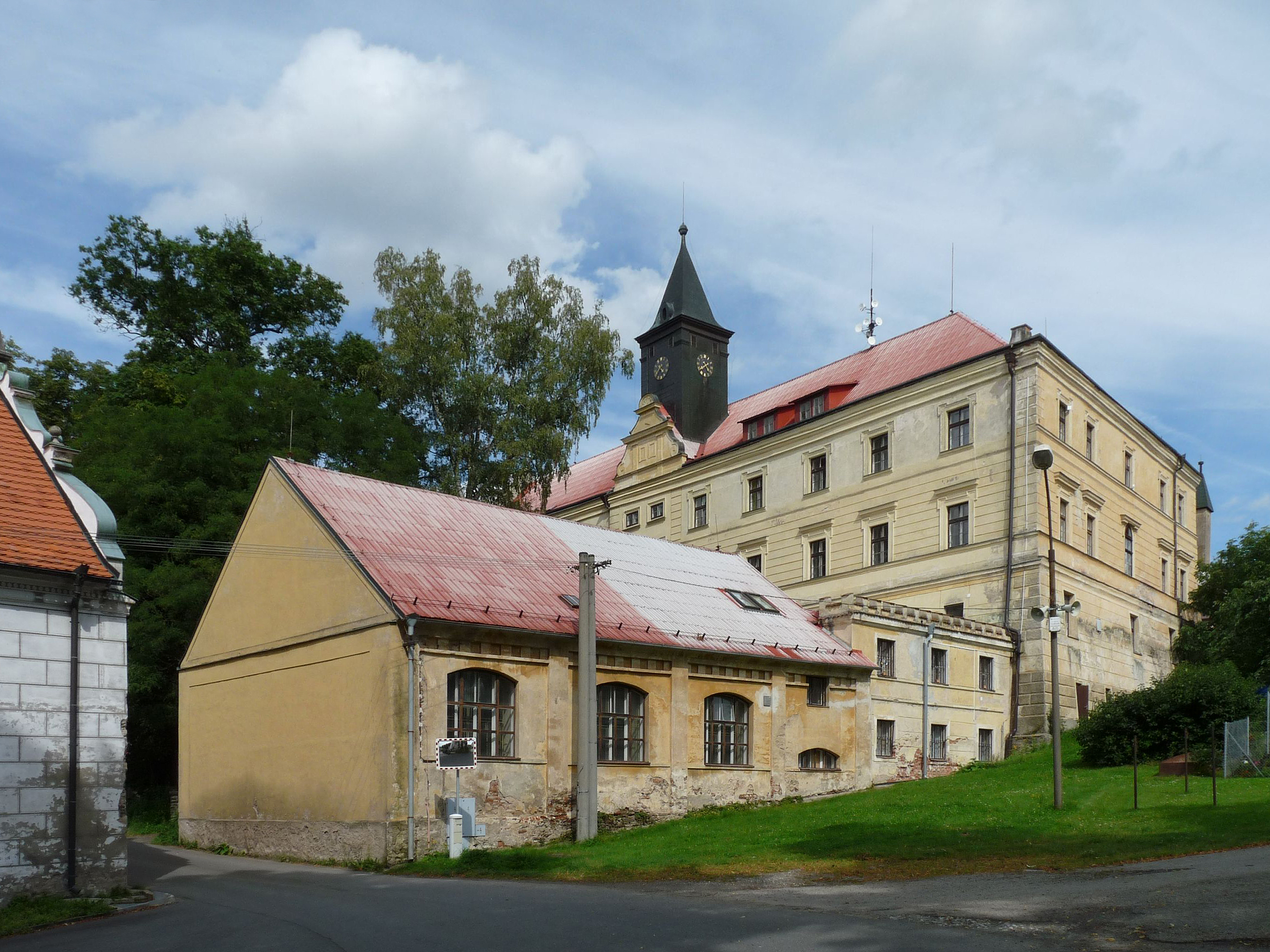
Castle Radenín

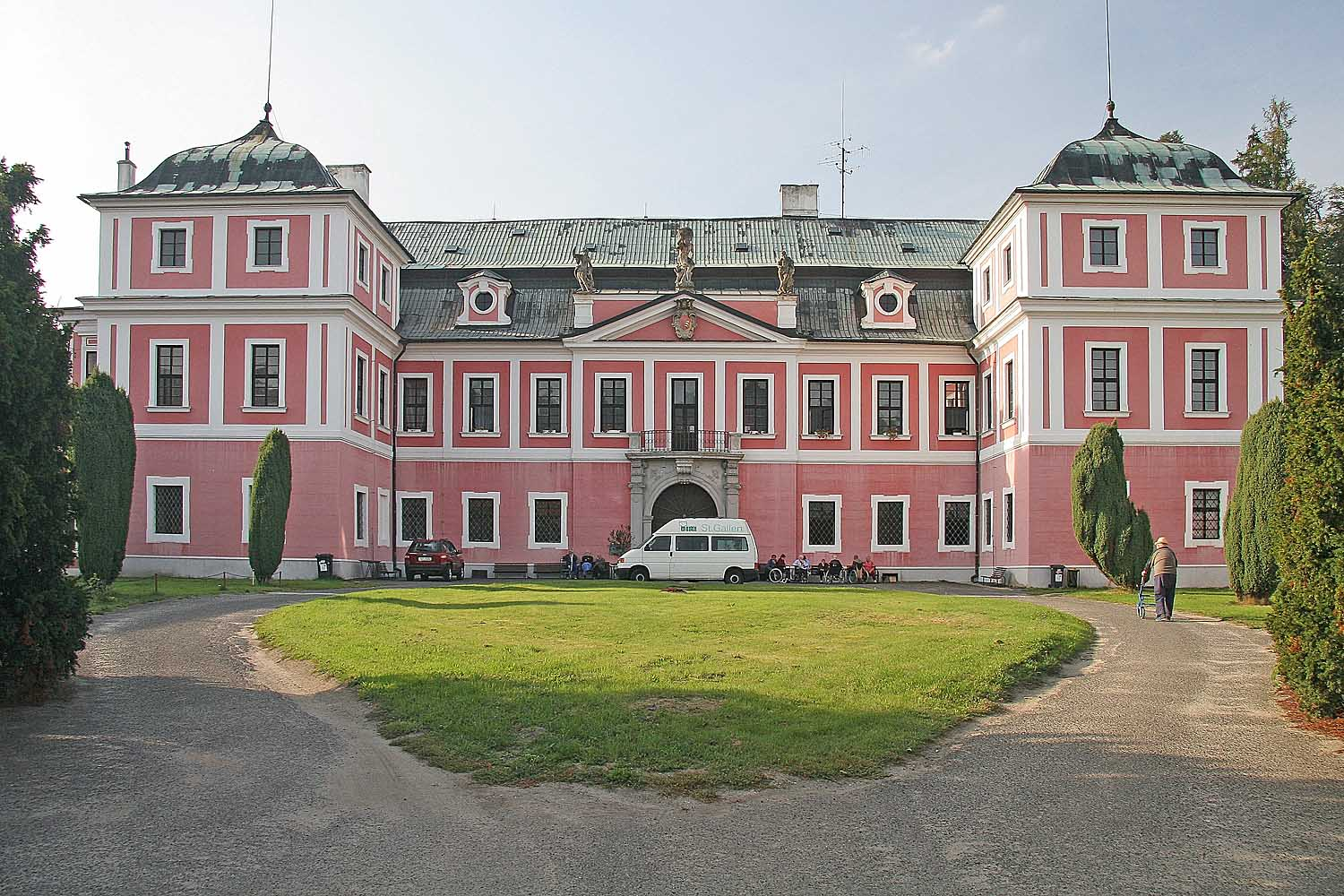
Castle Sloup

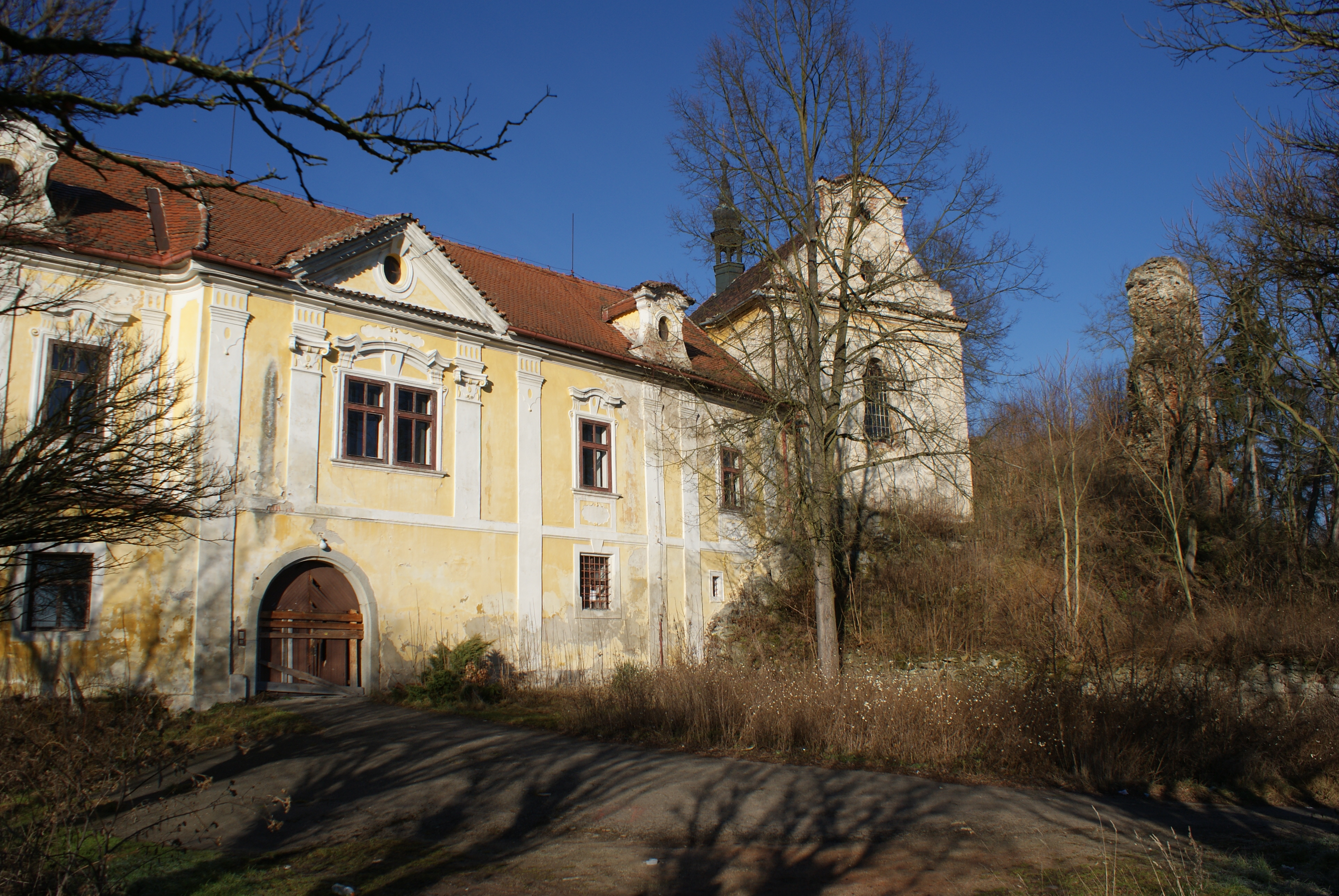
Castle Střela

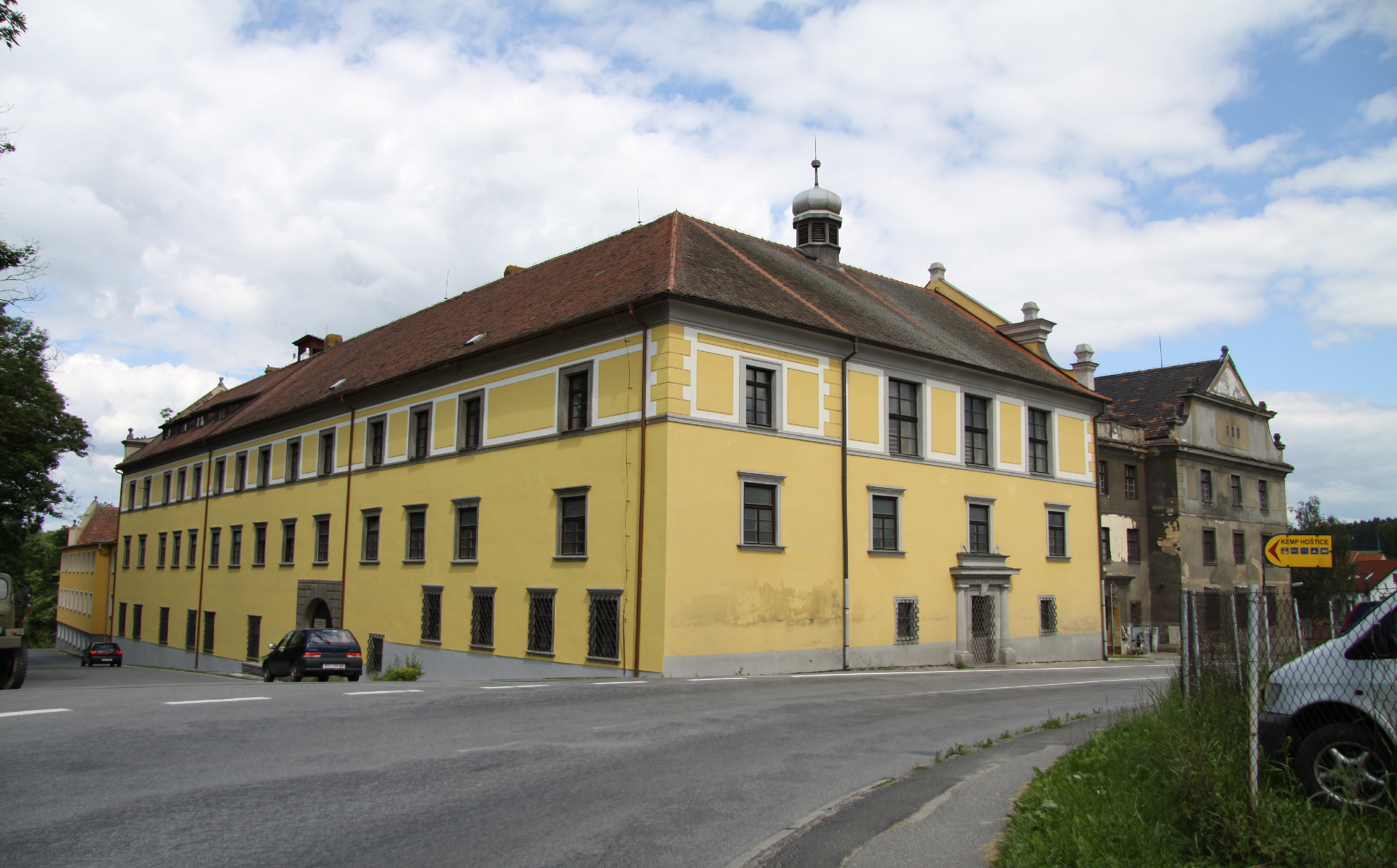
Castle Střelské Hoštice

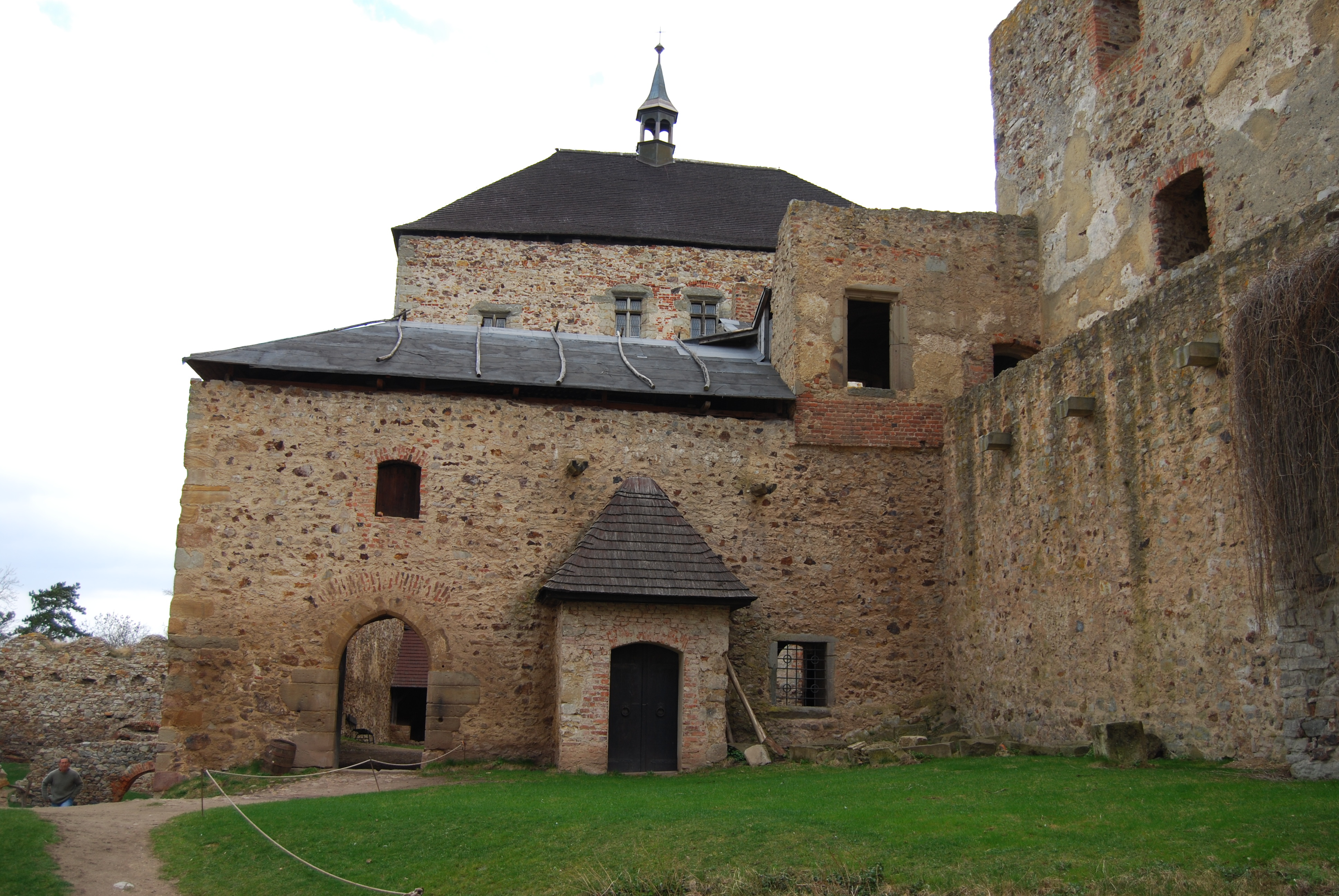
Točník Castle

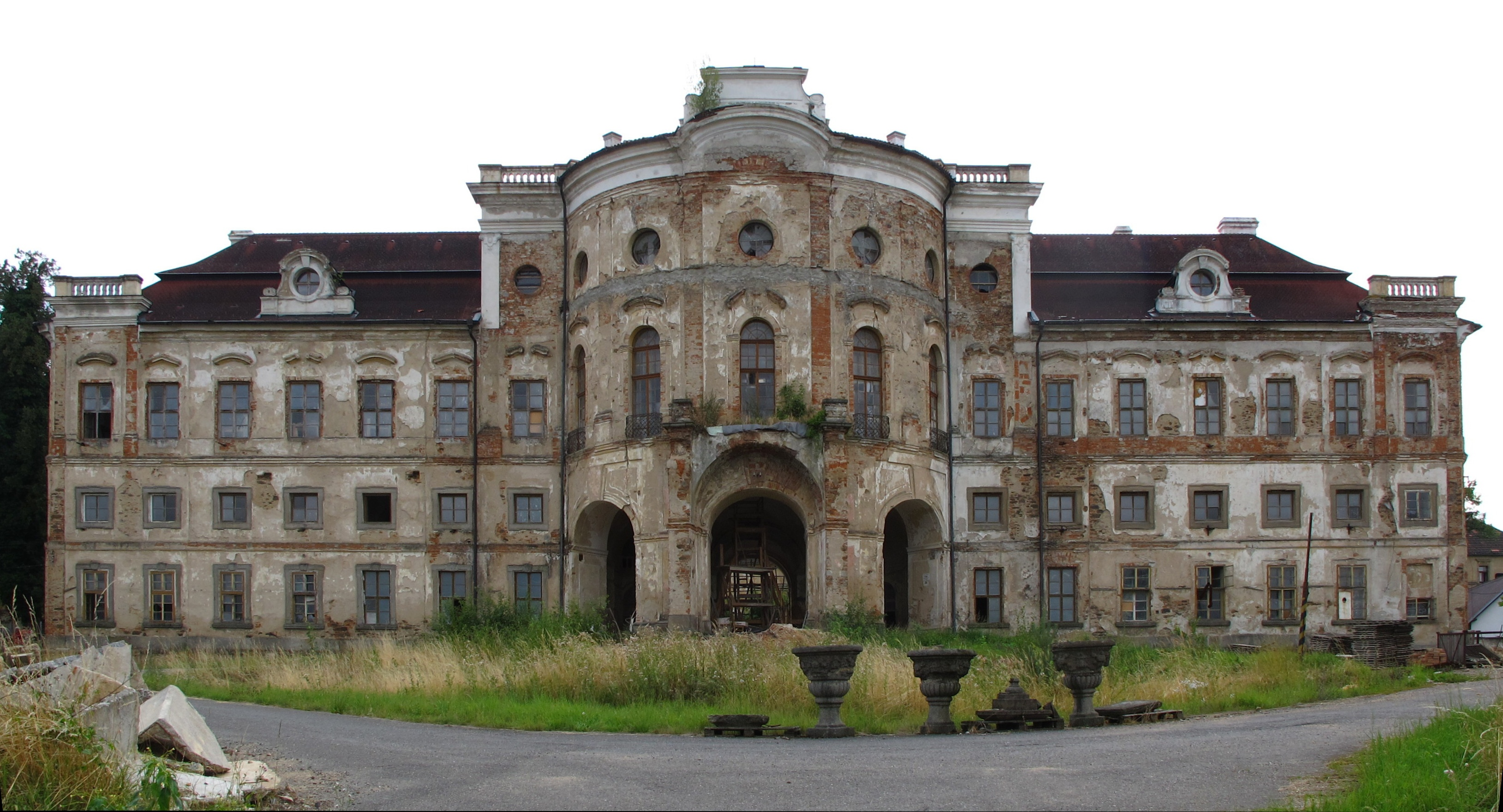
Castle Týnec

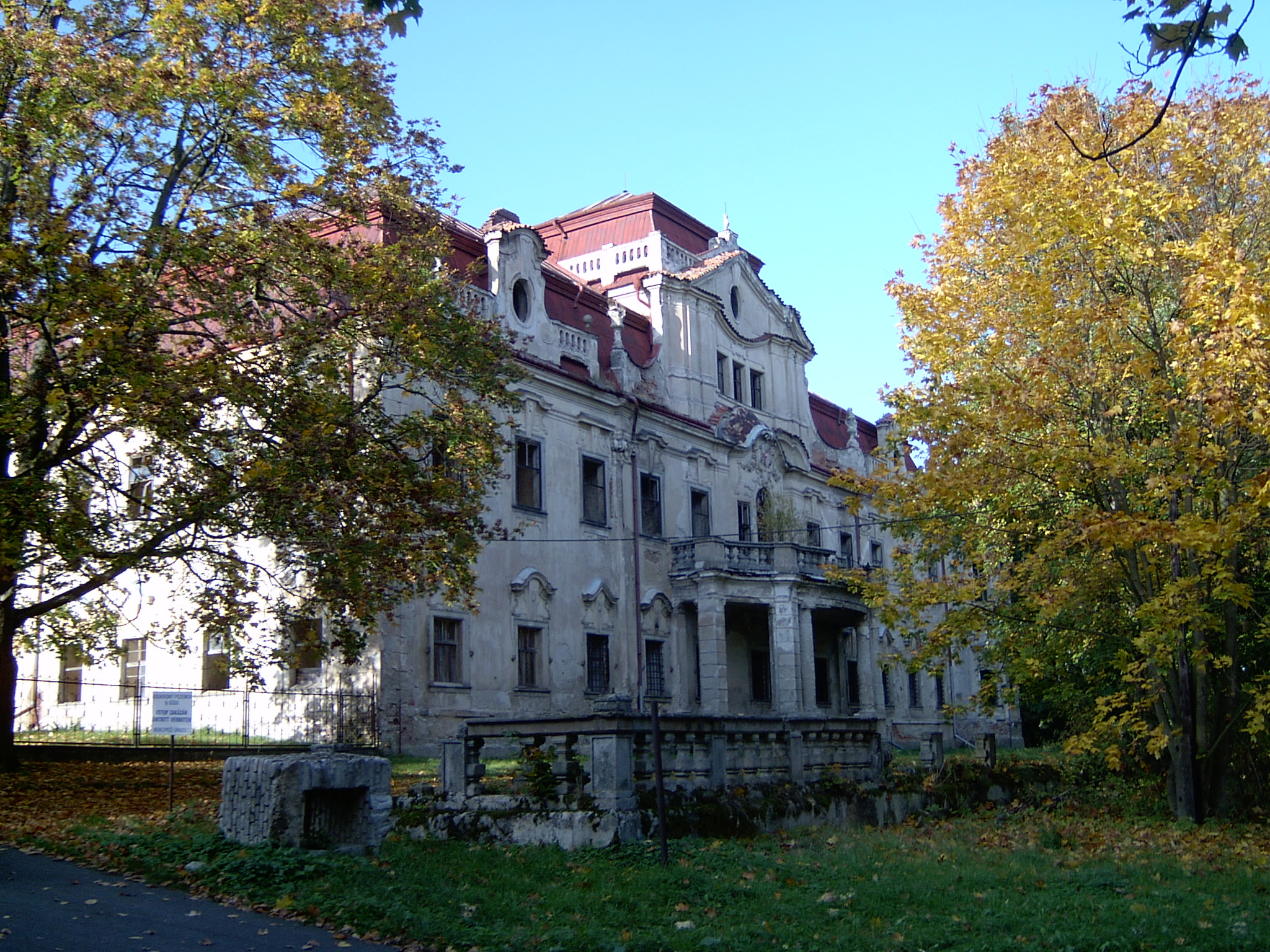
Castle Velké Dvorce

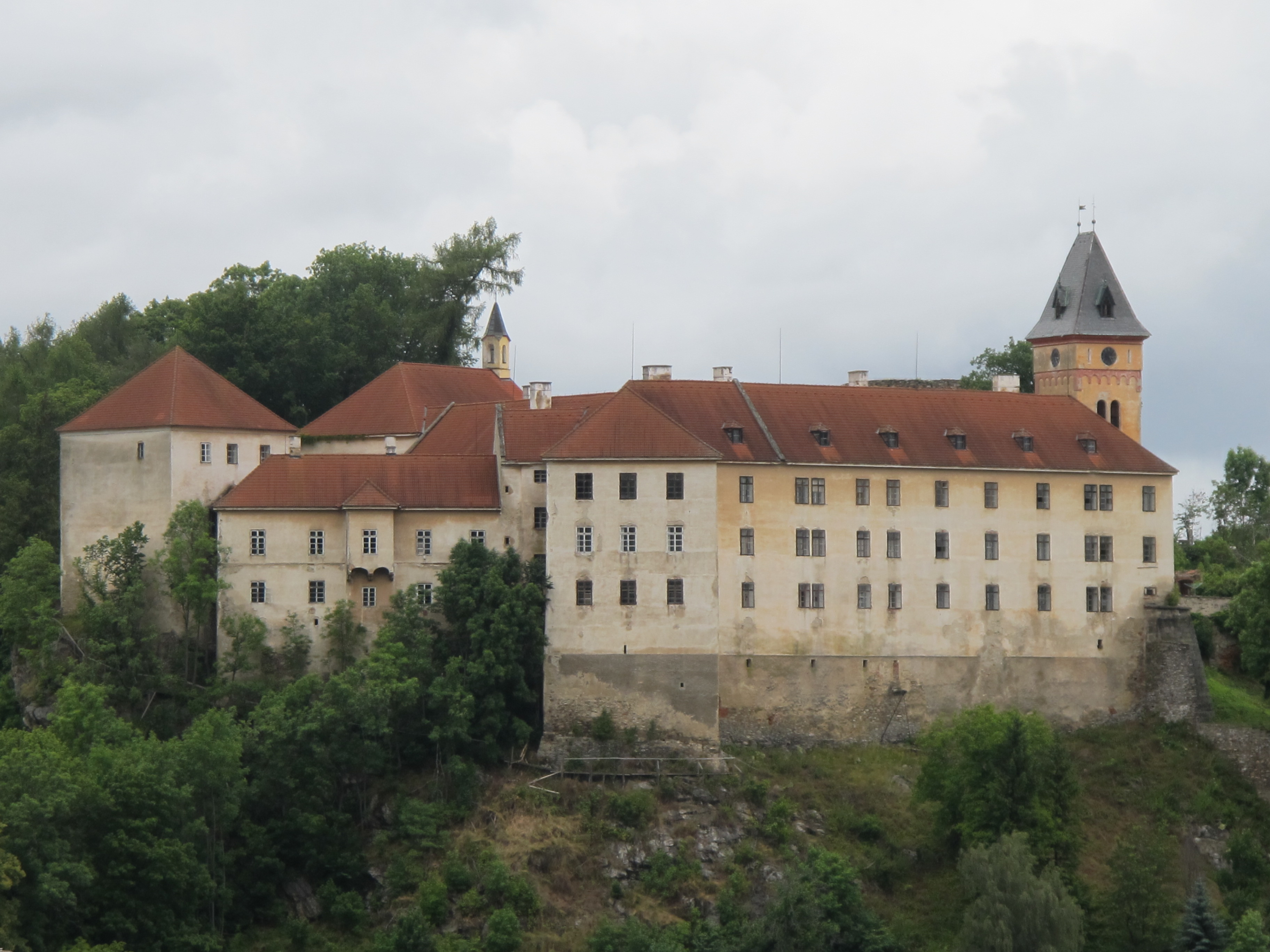
Castle Vimperk

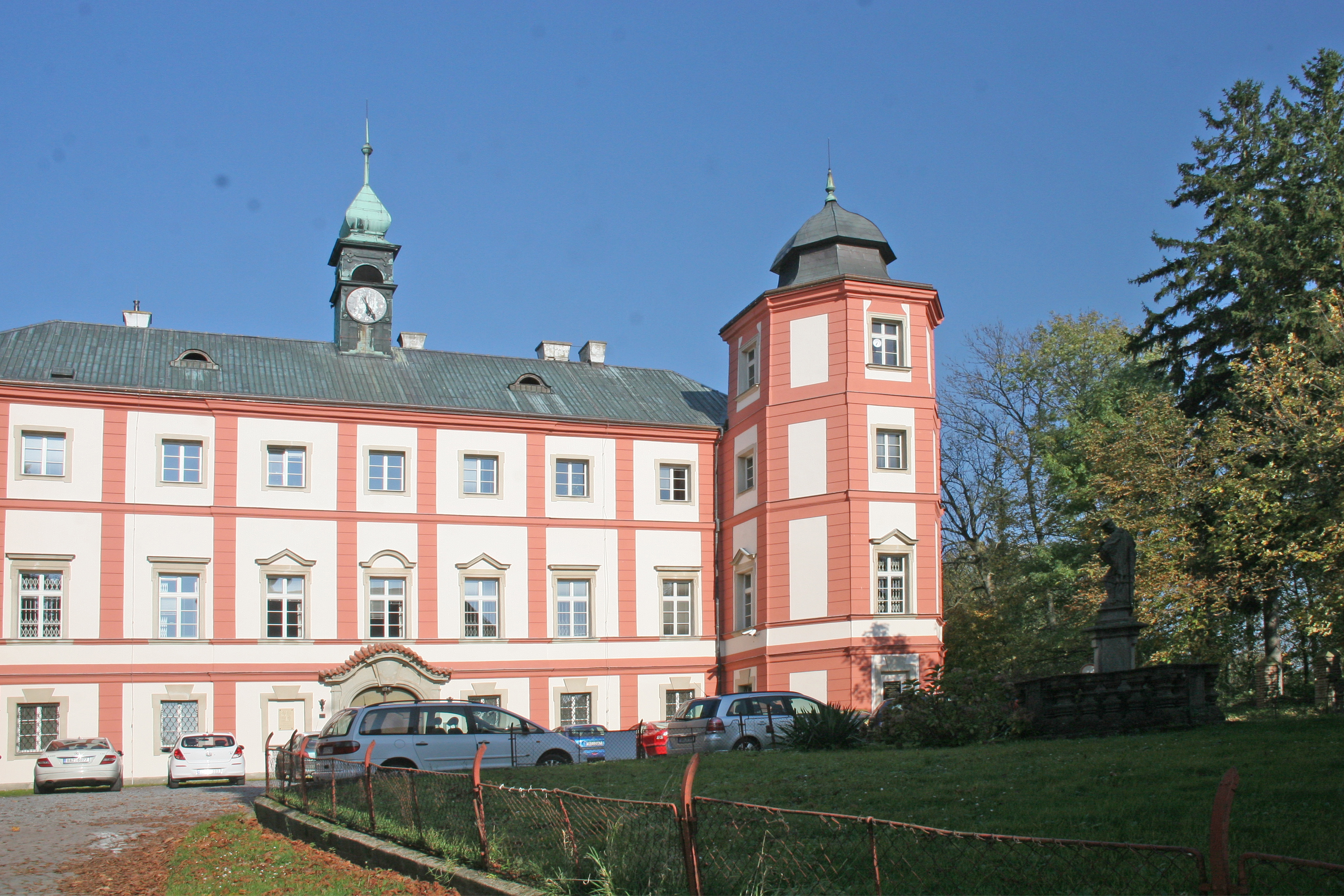
Castle Zámrsk

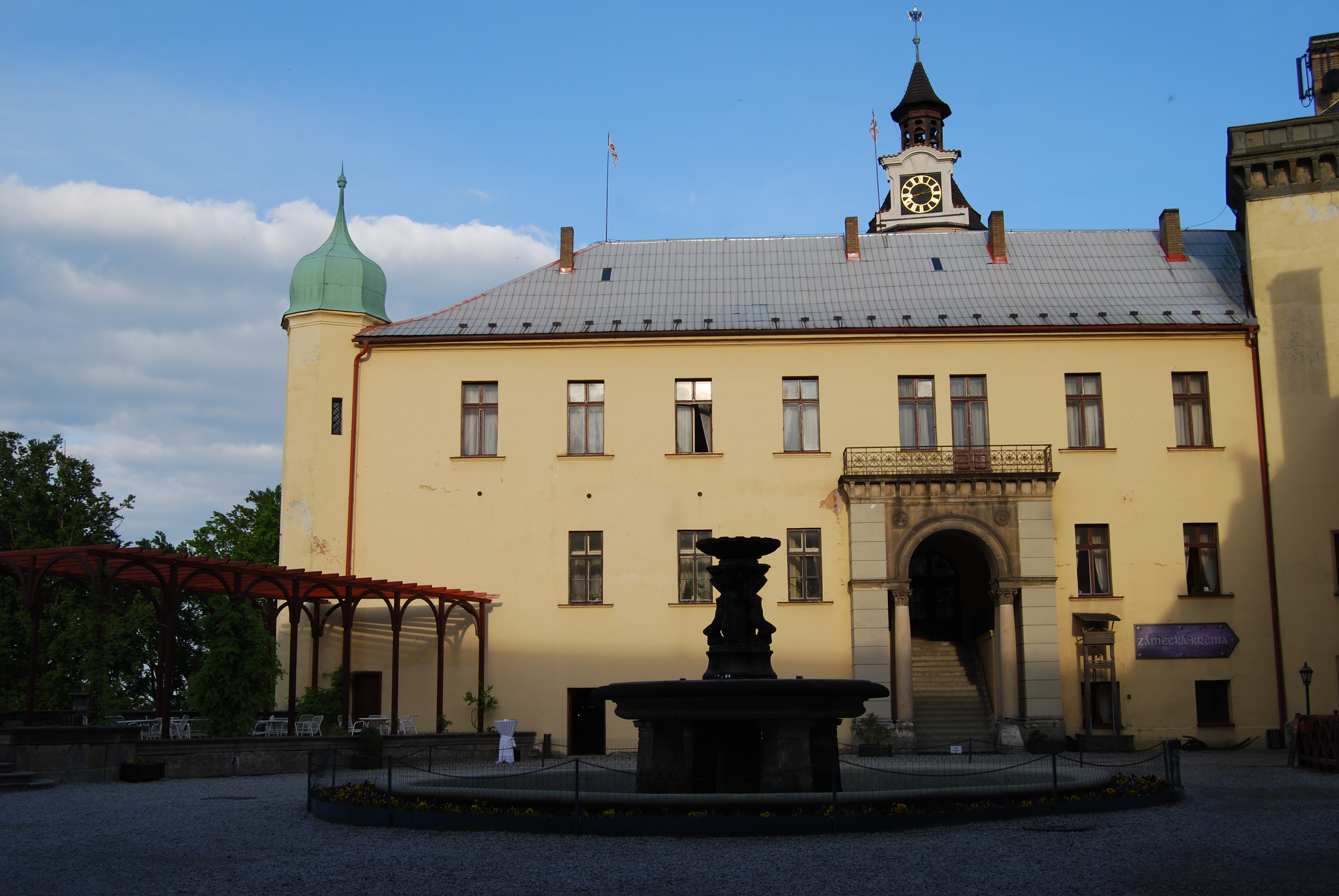
Castle Zbiroh

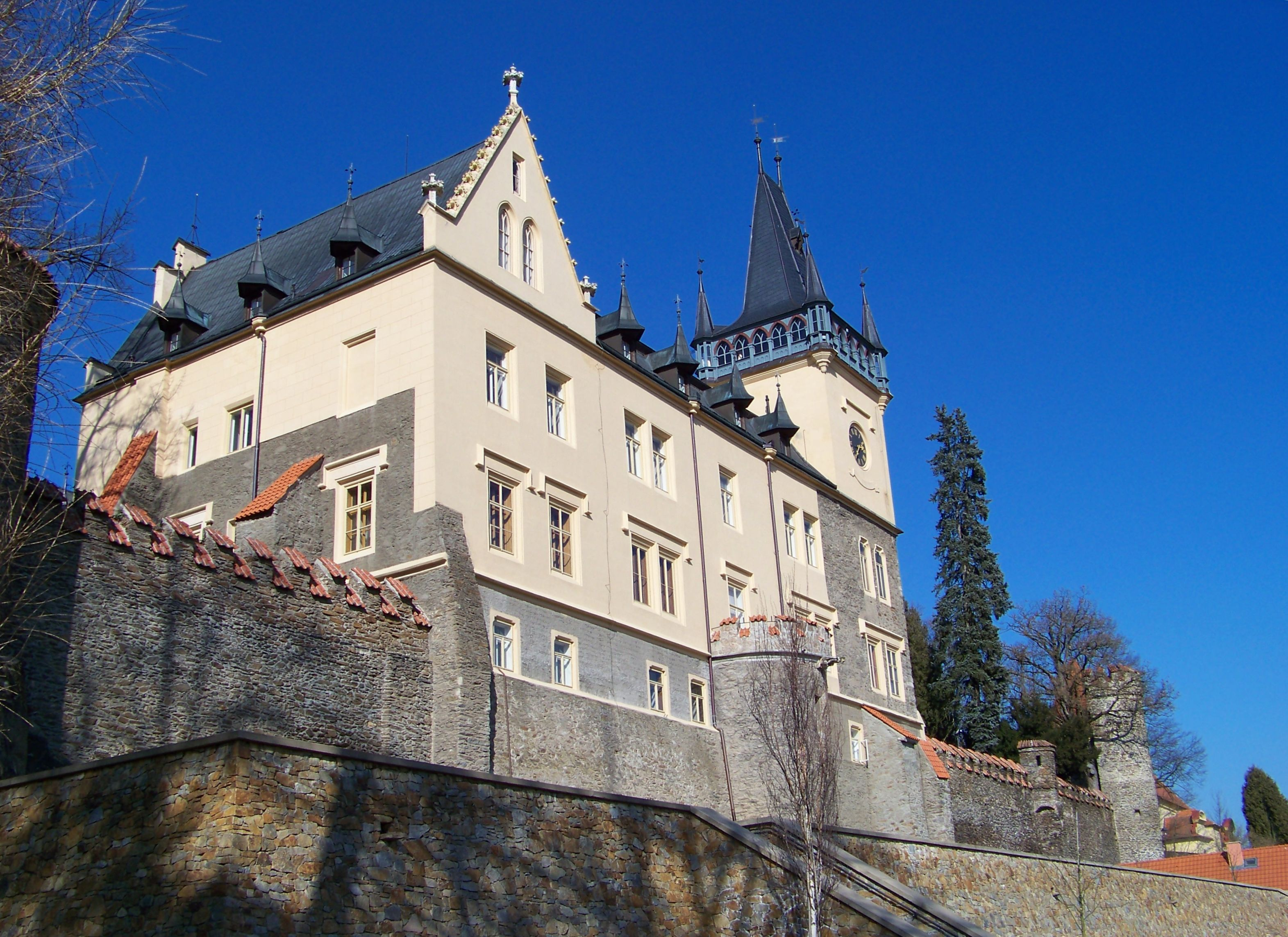
Castle Zruč nad Sázavou

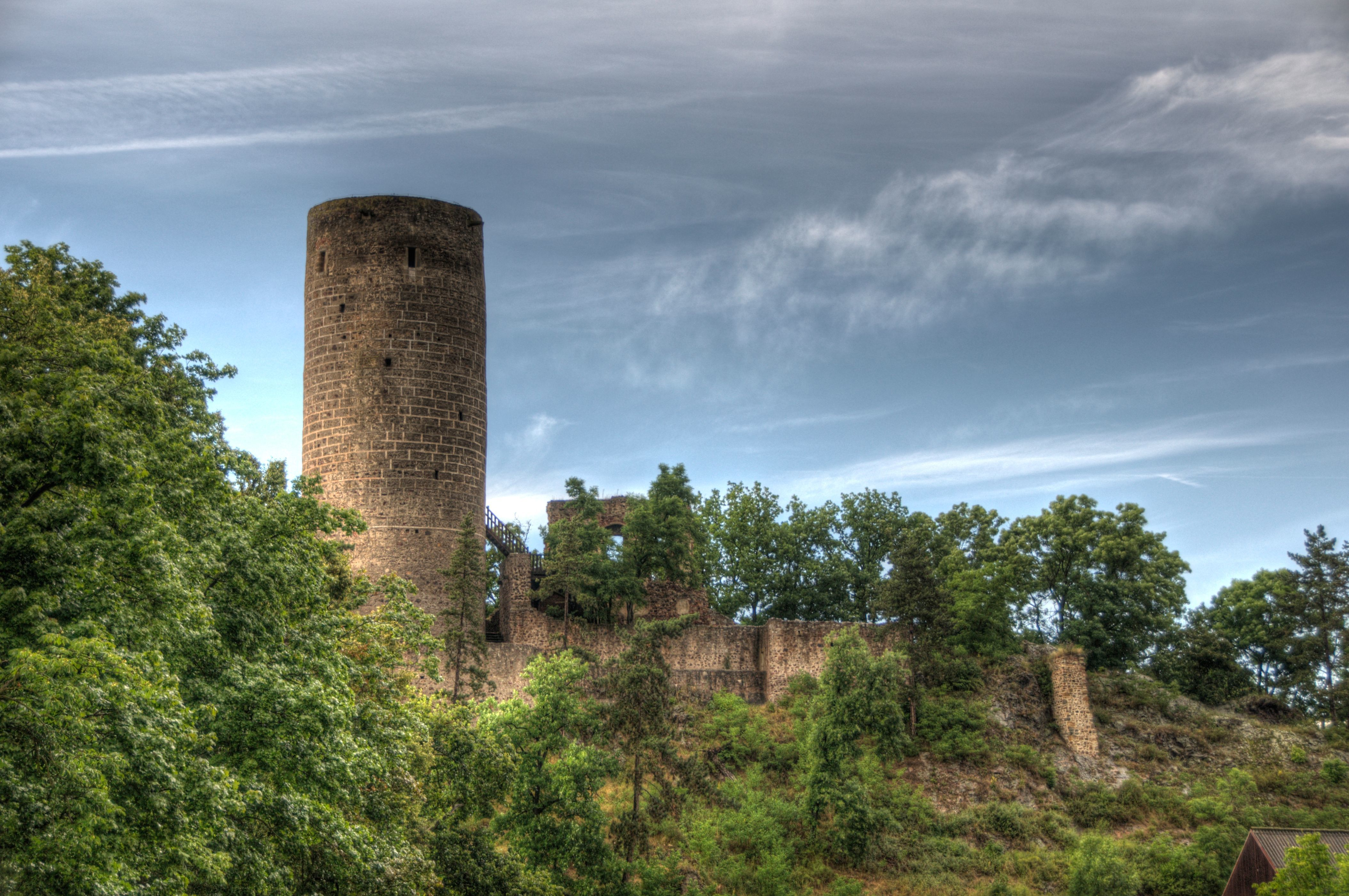
Žebrák Castle

== Coat of Arms ==
The original Kolowratian coat of arms was composed of an or wheel with eight spokes in a gules field. This familial coat of arms is also common to other families, which explains the theory of a common forefather for the Kolowrats, the Janovics, the Čejkas, and the Dvořeckýs. The azure shield features an argent and gules party per pale eagle with arms and a half moon finished with clover trefoils in or. Since the 15th century, the eagle has featured the royal crown in or on the neck. Having acquired the Countship title, the lineage of the Liesbsteinskýs added a second tail to the eagle along with a small Austrian heart shield (in gules with argent bar). The crest above the helmet, which is decorated with a crown in or and mantlings in argent and gules, is formed by closed eagle wings with a half moon finished in clover trefoils in or, a princely crown in or, and a crowned shield in gules with argent bar.

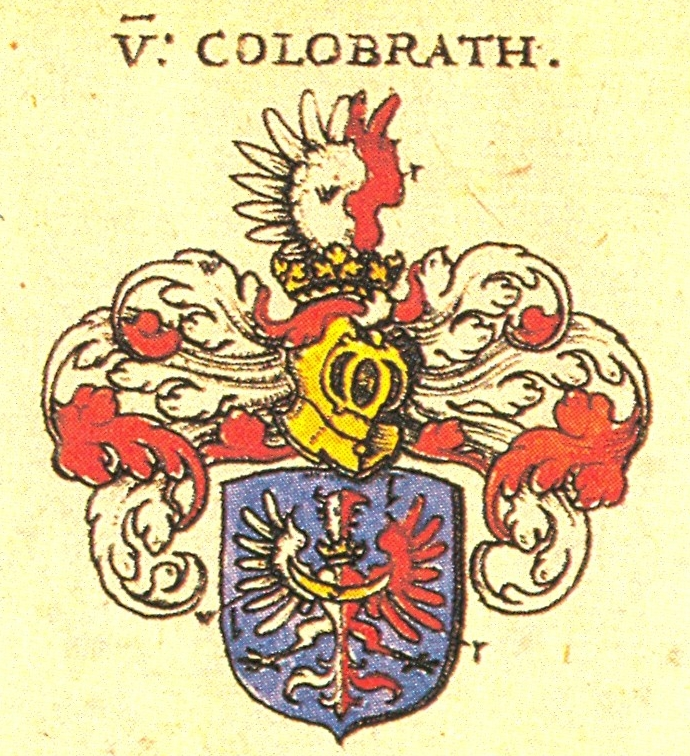
The Kolowratian coat of arms according to the Johann Siebmacher's armorial (1605)

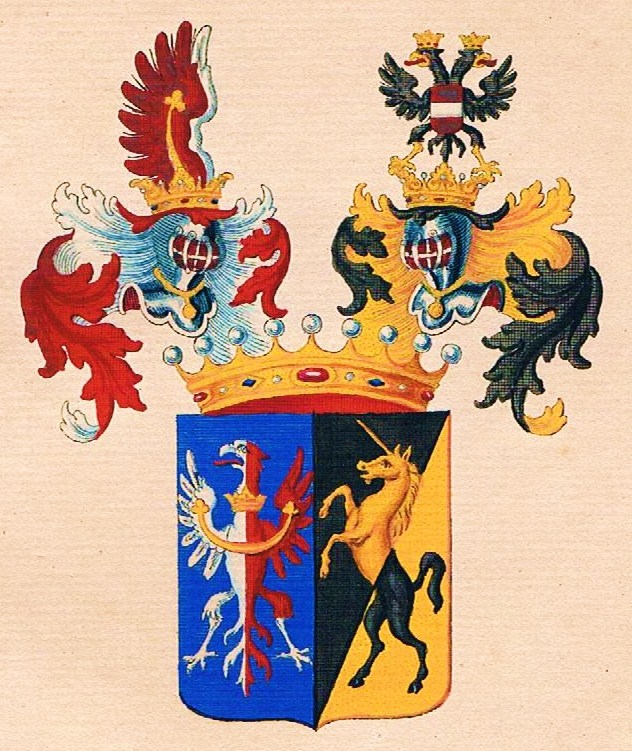
The coat of arms of the Counts Krakowský of Kolowrat, Barons of Újezd (the Březnický lineage who inherited the possessions and the coat of arms of the Jeníšek of Újezd)

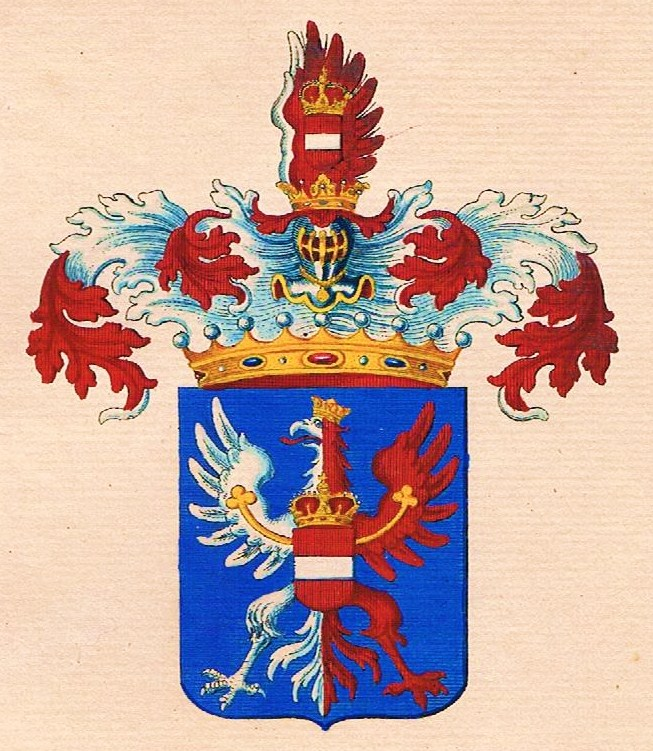
The coat of arms of the Liebsteinský of Kolowrat

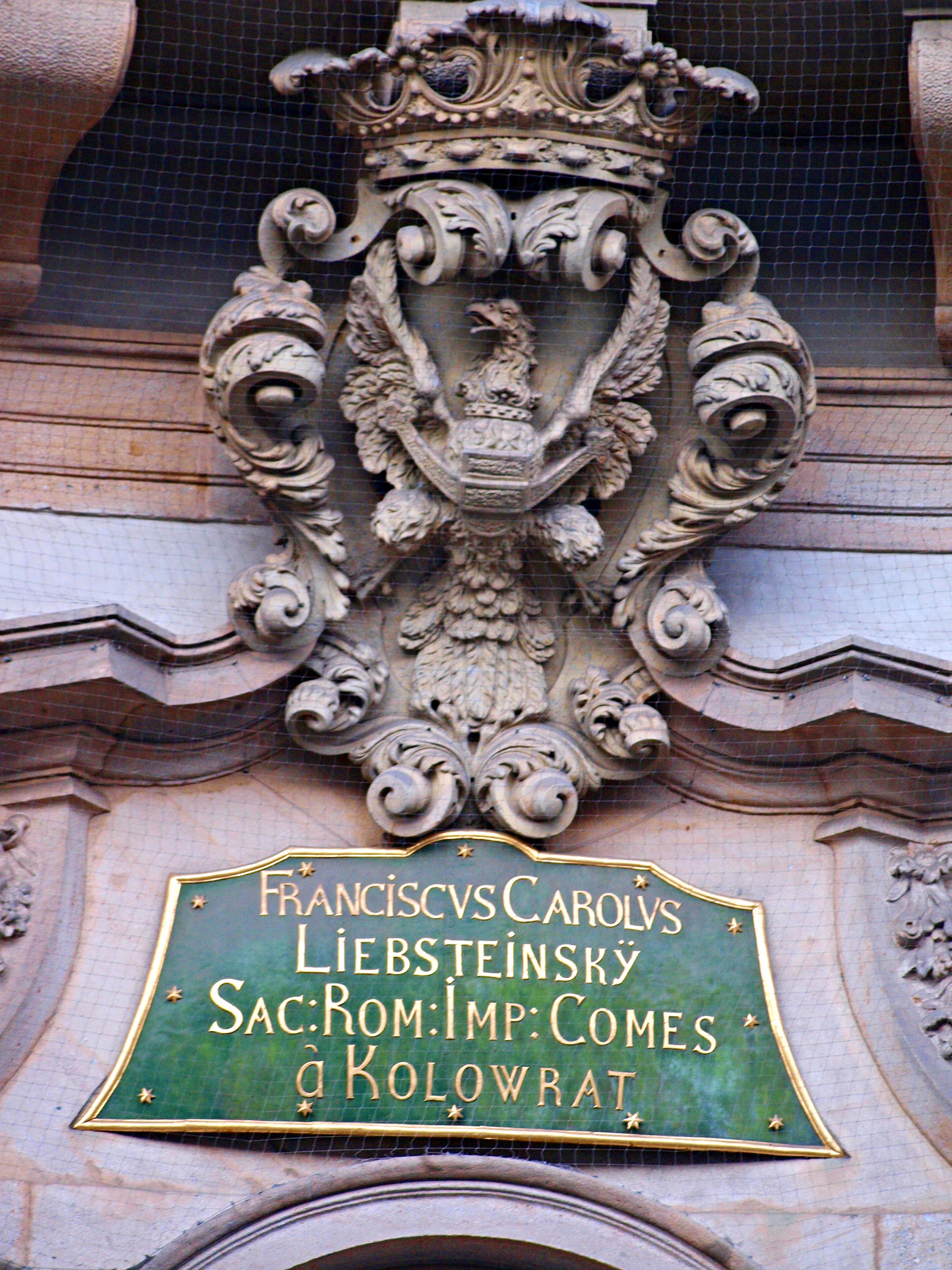
Erb říšského

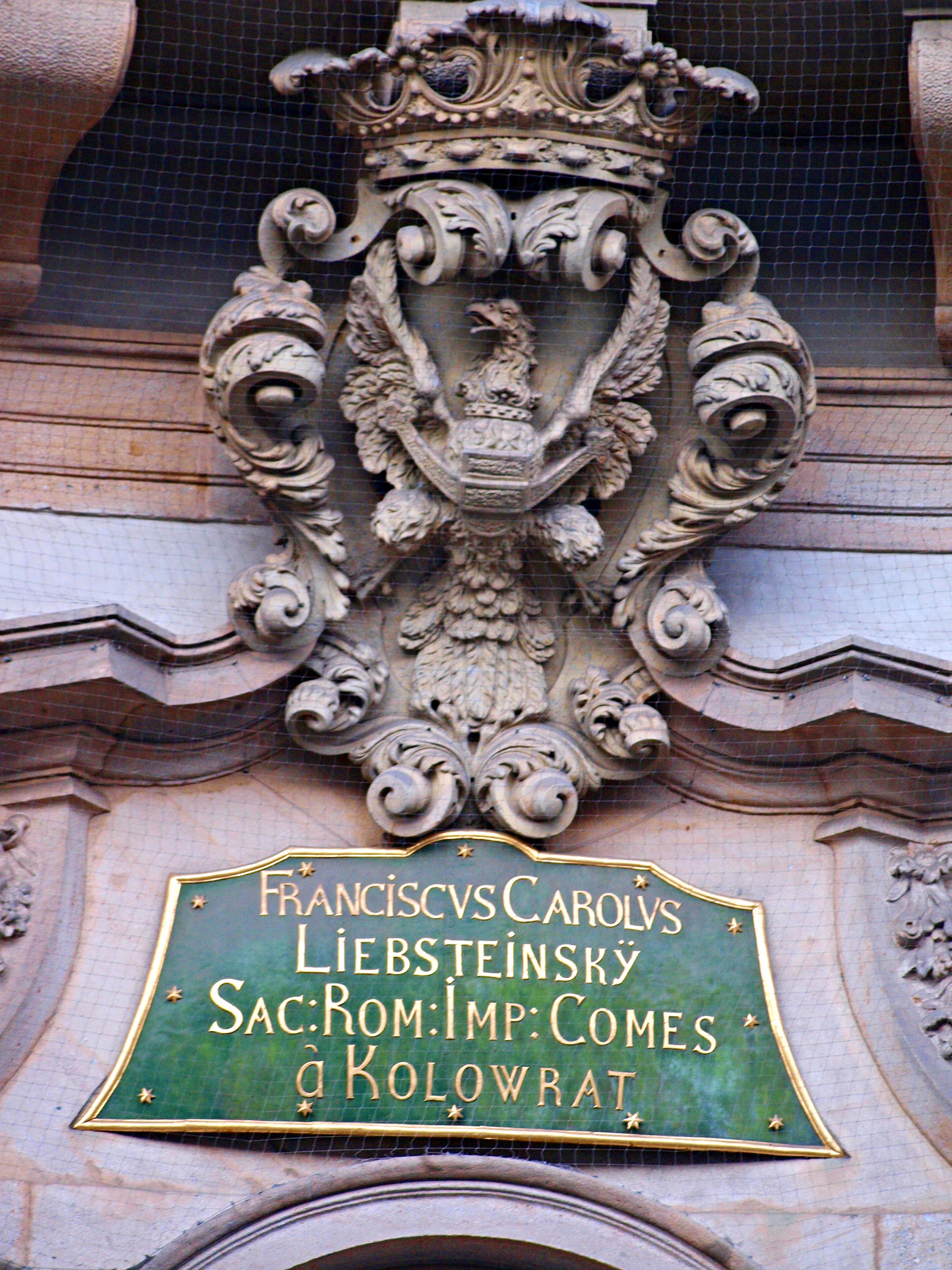
The coat of arms of the Imperial Count František Karel Liebsteinský of Kolowrat placed at the Church of St. Nicholas at Prague's Malá Strana

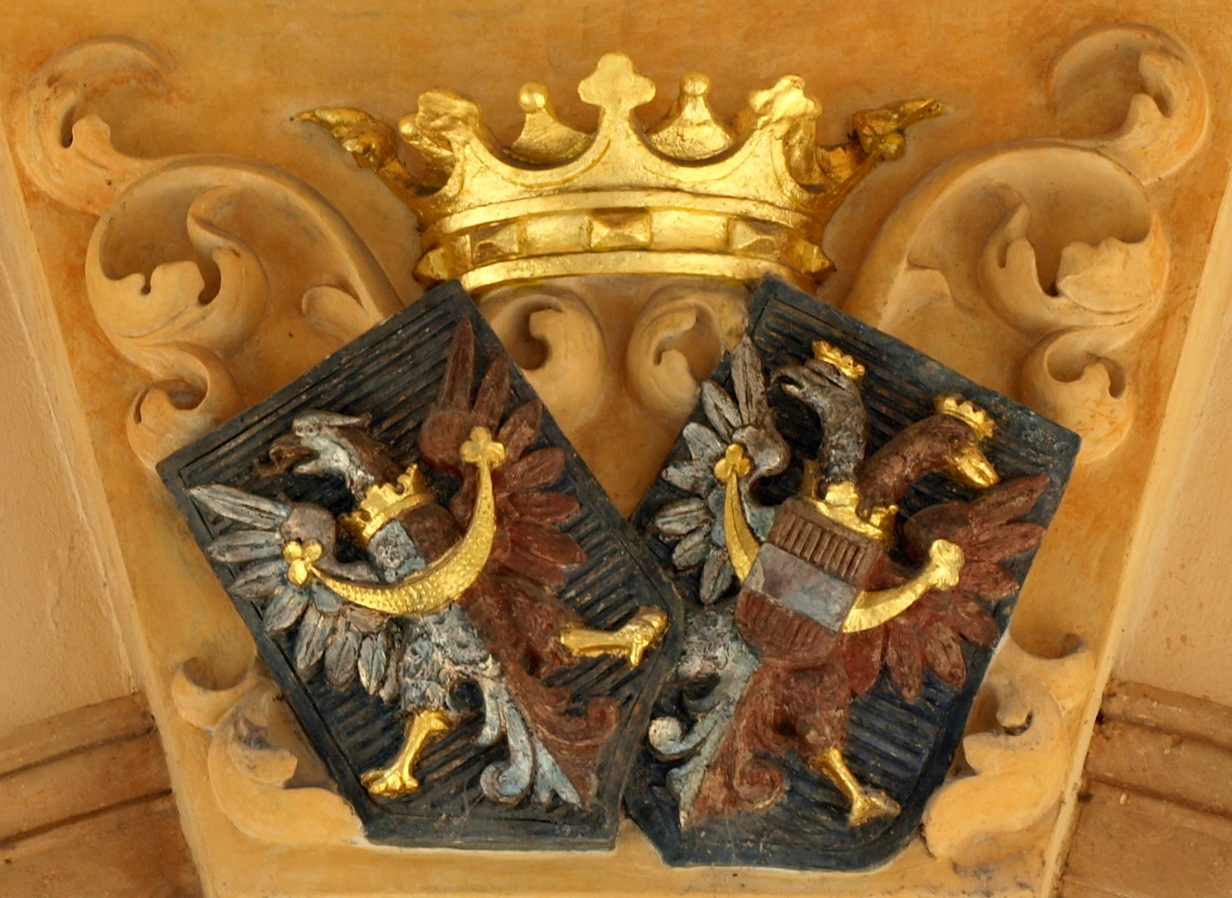
The coat of arms of the Krakowskýs of Kolowrat placed at the New Kolowrat Palace at Prague's Na Příkopě Street

== Relatives ==
Throughout the years, the Kolowrats have created family bonds with the houses of Berka, Colloredo-Mannsfeld, Gutstein, Lobkowicz, Martinic, Schwarzenberg, Schlik, Sternberg, and Wallenstein.

== Literature ==
- HALADA, Jan. Lexikon české šlechty : Erby, fakta, osobnosti, sídla a zajímavosti. 1. Praha: Akropolis, 1992. ISBN 80-901020-3-4. Kapitola Kolovratové, s. 75–77.JUŘÍK, Pavel. Encyklopedie šlechtických rodů. Praha: Euromedia - Knižní klub, 2014. 464 s. ISBN 978-80-242-4573-7.
- JUŘÍK, Pavel. Kolowratové. Věrně a stále. Praha: Euromedia - Knižní klub, 2016. 152 s. ISBN 978-80-242-5163-9.
- PELANT, Jan. Erby české, moravské a slezské šlechty. Vývoj erbů a stručné dějiny 610 rodů. Praha: Lidové noviny, 2013. 622 s. ISBN 9788074222542.
- POUZAR, Vladimír. Almanach českých šlechtických rodů. Praha: Martin, 2011. 493 s. ISBN 978-80-904241-2-8.
