= Bogdanov affair =

2002 French academic dispute

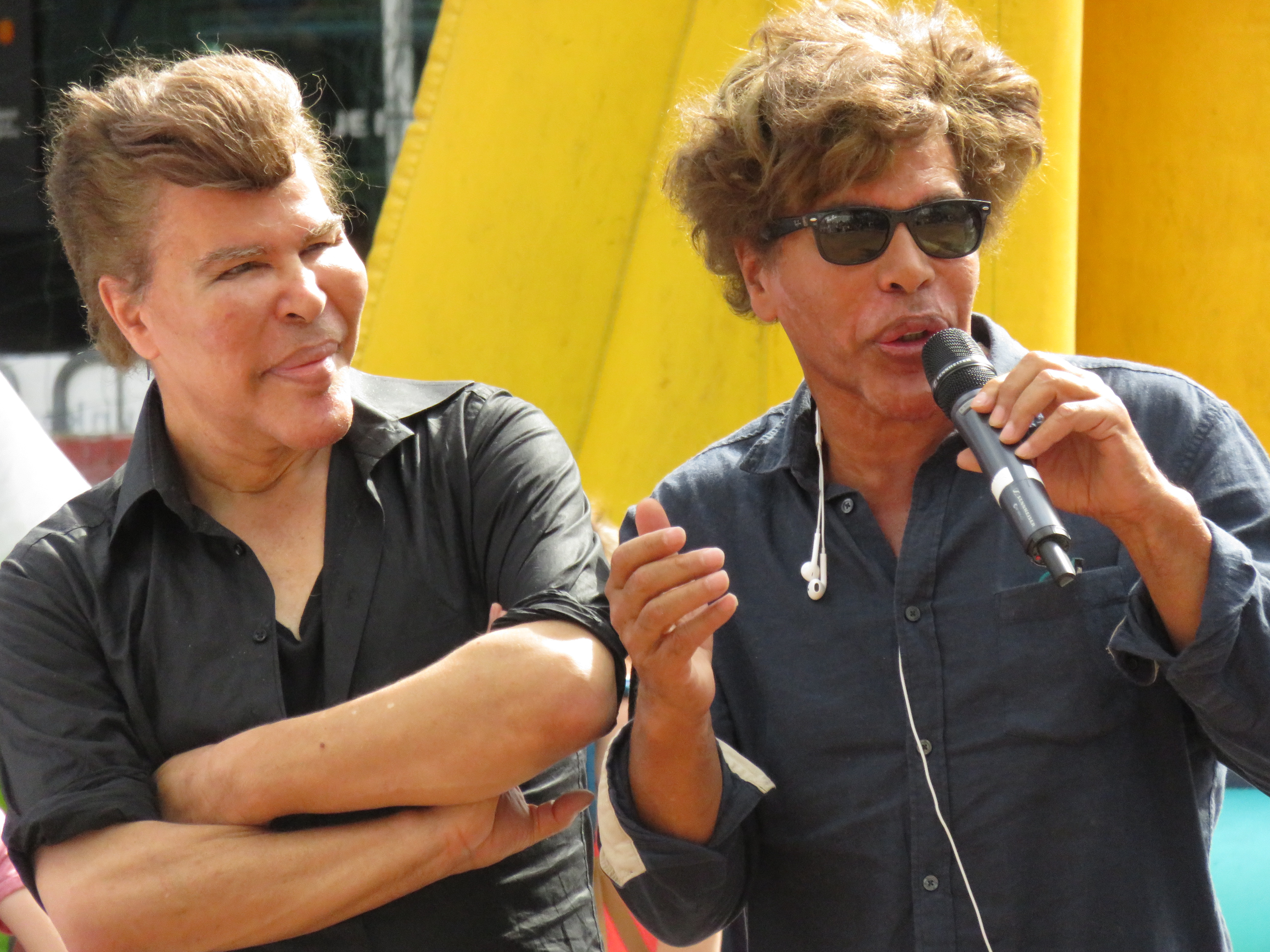
Igor Bogdanov (left) and Grichka Bogdanov (right) in 2016

The Bogdanov (Note: usually spelled Bogdanoff in French language publications) affair was a controversy in the early 2000s over the legitimacy of the PhD degrees in theoretical physics obtained at the University of Burgundy by French twins Igor and Grichka Bogdanov in 2002 and 1999, respectively.

The controversy began in 2002, with an allegation that the twins, popular in France for hosting science-themed TV shows, had obtained PhDs with nonsensical work. Rumors spread on Usenet newsgroups that their work was a deliberate hoax intended to target weaknesses in the peer review system that physics journals use to select papers for publication. While the Bogdanov brothers continued to defend the legitimacy of their work, the debate over whether it represented a contribution to physics spread from Usenet to many other internet forums, eventually receiving coverage in the mainstream media. A French National Centre for Scientific Research (CNRS) internal report later concluded that their theses had no scientific value.

The incident prompted criticism of the Bogdanovs' approach to science popularization, led to a number of lawsuits, and provoked reflection among physicists as to how and why the peer review system can fail.

== Origin ==
The Bogdanov papers assert that there is evidence of what happened during the first 10^{−43} seconds of the Big Bang, known as the Planck era. Present knowledge is unable to determine what happened during the Planck era, and the Bogdanov publications purported to have discovered what happened during this earliest epoch, and even before the moment of the putative cosmic singularity itself.

The Bogdanov brothers were born in 1949 in the small village of Saint-Lary, in the Gascony region of southwest France. The brothers each studied applied mathematics in Paris, but then began careers in television, hosting several popular programs on science and science fiction. The first of these, Temps X (Time X), ran from 1979 to 1989.

In 1991, the Bogdanovs published their book Dieu et la Science (God and Science), drawn from interviews with Catholic philosopher Jean Guitton, which became a French bestseller. This book provoked a dispute of its own when University of Virginia astronomy professor Trinh Xuan Thuan accused the Bogdanovs of plagiarizing his 1988 book The Secret Melody: And Man Created the Universe. After a legal battle in France, during which a judge initially ruled in Thuan's favour, Thuan and the Bogdanovs settled out of court, and the Bogdanovs later denied all wrongdoing. Thuan suggests that the plagiarism suit pressed the brothers to obtain doctorates as fast as possible, since (according to Thuan) the back cover of the book claimed that the Bogdanovs held doctorates when they did not. In 1993, the brothers began work toward doctorates, first working under the mathematical physicist Moshé Flato of the University of Burgundy. Flato died in 1998, and his colleague Daniel Sternheimer (of CNRS) took over the job of supervising the Bogdanovs. According to Sternheimer, the twins viewed themselves as "the Einstein brothers" and had a propensity to voice vague, "impressionistic" statements; he considered guiding their efforts "like teaching My Fair Lady to speak with an Oxford accent." As he said to The Chronicle of Higher Education, Sternheimer did not consider himself an expert in all the topics Grichka Bogdanov included in his thesis, but judged that those portions within his specialty were PhD-quality work.

Grichka Bogdanov was given a PhD by the University of Burgundy (Dijon) in 1999, though this doctorate is sometimes erroneously described as having been granted by the École Polytechnique. He originally applied for a degree in physics, but was instead given one in mathematics, and was first required to significantly rewrite his thesis, de-emphasizing the physics content. Around the same time, Igor Bogdanov failed the defense of his thesis. His advisors subsequently agreed to allow him to obtain a doctorate if he could publish three peer-reviewed journal articles. In 2002, after publishing the requisite articles, Igor was given a PhD in theoretical physics from the University of Burgundy. Both of the brothers received the lowest passing grade of "honorable", which is seldom given, as Daniel Sternheimer told The New York Times science reporter Dennis Overbye. In justifying the conferring of doctoral degrees to the Bogdanovs, Sternheimer told the Times, "These guys worked for 10 years without pay. They have the right to have their work recognized with a diploma, which is nothing much these days."

In 2001 and 2002, the brothers published five papers in peer-reviewed physics journals, including Annals of Physics and Classical and Quantum Gravity. The controversy over the Bogdanovs' work began on October 22, 2002, with an email sent by University of Tours physicist Max Niedermaier to University of Pittsburgh physicist Ezra T. Newman. Niedermaier suggested that the Bogdanovs' PhD theses and papers were "spoof[s]", created by throwing together instances of theoretical-physics jargon, including terminology from string theory: "The abstracts are delightfully meaningless combinations of buzzwords ... which apparently have been taken seriously." Copies of the email reached American mathematical physicist John Baez, and on 23 October he created a discussion thread about the Bogdanovs' work on the Usenet newsgroup sci.physics.research, titled "Physics bitten by reverse Alan Sokal hoax?" Baez was comparing the Bogdanovs' publications to the 1996 Sokal affair, in which physicist Alan Sokal successfully submitted an intentionally nonsensical paper to a cultural studies journal in order to criticize that field's lax standards for discussing science. The Bogdanovs quickly became a popular discussion topic, with most respondents agreeing that the papers were flawed. The story spread in public media, prompting Niedermaier to offer an apology to the Bogdanovs, admitting that he had not read the papers firsthand. The Bogdanovs' background in entertainment lent some plausibility to the idea that they were attempting a deliberate hoax, but Igor Bogdanov quickly denied the accusation.

The Bogdanov brothers themselves participated in the online discussions, sometimes using pseudonyms or represented by friends acting as proxies. They used these methods to defend their work and sometimes to insult their critics, among them the Nobel Prize recipient Georges Charpak.

In October 2002, the Bogdanovs released an email containing apparently supportive statements by Laurent Freidel, then a visiting professor at the Perimeter Institute. Soon after, Freidel denied writing any such remarks, telling the press that he had forwarded a message containing that text to a friend. The Bogdanovs then attributed the quoted passages to Freidel, who said, "I'm very upset about that because I have received e-mail from people in the community asking me why I've defended the Bogdanov brothers. When your name is used without your consent, it's a violation."

At the start of the controversy in the moderated group sci.physics.research, Igor Bogdanov denied that their published papers were a hoax, but when asked precise questions from physicists Steve Carlip and John Baez regarding mathematical details in the papers, failed to convince any other participants that these papers had any real scientific value. The New York Times reporter George Johnson described reading through the debate as "like watching someone trying to nail Jell-O to a wall", for the Bogdanovs had "developed their own private language, one that impinges on the vocabulary of science only at the edges."

== Media reports and comments from scientists ==
The online discussion was quickly followed by media attention. The Register reported on the dispute on November 1, 2002, and stories in The Chronicle of Higher Education, Nature, The New York Times, and other publications appeared soon after. These news stories included commentary by physicists.

=== Thesis readers ===
One of the scientists who approved Igor Bogdanov's thesis, Roman Jackiw of the Massachusetts Institute of Technology, spoke to The New York Times reporter Dennis Overbye. Overbye wrote that Jackiw was intrigued by the thesis, although it contained many points he did not understand. Jackiw defended the thesis:

All these were ideas that could possibly make sense. It showed some originality and some familiarity with the jargon. That's all I ask.

In contrast, Ignatios Antoniadis (of the École Polytechnique), who approved Grichka Bogdanov's thesis, later reversed his judgment of it. Antoniadis told Le Monde,

I had given a favorable opinion for Grichka's defense, based on a rapid and indulgent reading of the thesis text. Alas, I was completely mistaken. The scientific language was just an appearance behind which hid incompetence and ignorance of even basic physics.

=== Pre- and post-publication official commentary on the journal articles ===
In May 2001, the journal Classical and Quantum Gravity (CQG) reviewed an article authored by Igor and Grichka Bogdanov, titled "Topological theory of the initial singularity of spacetime". One of the referees' reports stated that the article was "Sound, original, and of interest. With revisions I expect the paper to be suitable for publication." The paper was accepted by the journal seven months later.

However, after the publication of the article and the publicity surrounding the controversy, mathematician Greg Kuperberg posted to Usenet a statement written by the journal's senior publisher, Andrew Wray, and its co-editor, Hermann Nicolai. The statement read, in part,

Regrettably, despite the best efforts, the refereeing process cannot be 100% effective. Thus the paper ... made it through the review process even though, in retrospect, it does not meet the standards expected of articles in this journal... The paper was discussed extensively at the annual Editorial Board meeting ... and there was general agreement that it should not have been published. Since then several steps have been taken to further improve the peer review process in order to improve the quality assessment on articles submitted to the journal and reduce the likelihood that this could happen again.

The paper in question was, however, not officially withdrawn by the journal. Later, the editor-in-chief of the journal issued a slightly different statement on behalf of the Institute of Physics, which owns the journal, in which he insisted on the fact that their usual peer-review procedures had been followed, but no longer commented on the value of the paper. (Note: In particular the sentences "...it does not meet the standards expected of articles in this journal" and "The paper was discussed extensively at the annual Editorial Board meeting ... and there was general agreement that it should not have been published" were removed. The former phrase was, however, quoted in The New York Times, the Chronicle of Higher Education and Nature.) Moreover, Die Zeit quoted Nicolai as saying that had the paper reached his desk, he would have immediately rejected it.

In 2001, the Czechoslovak Journal of Physics accepted an article written by Igor Bogdanov, entitled "Topological Origin of Inertia". The referee's report concluded: "In my opinion the results of the paper can be considered as original ones. I recommend the paper for publication but in a revised form." The following year, the Chinese Journal of Physics published Igor Bogdanov's "The KMS state of spacetime at the Planck scale". The report stated that "the viewpoint presented in this paper can be interesting as a possible approach of the Planck scale physics." Some corrections were requested.

Not all review evaluations were positive. Eli Hawkins, acting as a referee on behalf of the Journal of Physics A, suggested rejecting one of the Bogdanovs' papers: "It is difficult to describe what is wrong in Section 4, since almost nothing is right. [...] It would take up too much space to enumerate all the mistakes: indeed it is difficult to say where one error ends and the next begins. In conclusion, I would not recommend that this paper be published in this, or any, journal."

=== Online criticism of the papers ===
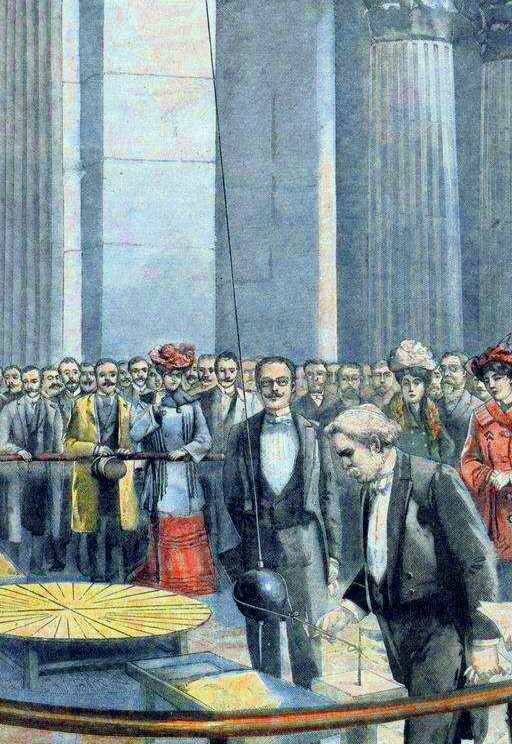
A Foucault pendulum, "an icon of French science", illustrated in the magazine Le Petit Parisien (1902).

After the start of the Usenet discussion, most comments were critical of the Bogdanovs' work. For example, John C. Baez stated that the Bogdanov papers are "a mishmash of superficially plausible sentences containing the right buzzwords in approximately the right order. There is no logic or cohesion in what they write." Jacques Distler voiced a similar opinion, proclaiming "The [Bogdanovs'] papers consist of buzzwords from various fields of mathematical physics, string theory and quantum gravity, strung together into syntactically correct, but semantically meaningless prose."

Others compared the quality of the Bogdanov papers with that seen over a wider arena. "The Bogdanoffs' work is significantly more incoherent than just about anything else being published", wrote Peter Woit. He continued, "But the increasingly low standard of coherence in the whole field is what allowed them to think they were doing something sensible and to get it published." Woit later devoted a chapter of his book Not Even Wrong (2006) to the Bogdanov affair.

Participants in the discussions were particularly unconvinced by a statement in the "Topological origin of inertia" paper that "whatever the orientation, the plane of oscillation of Foucault's pendulum is necessarily aligned with the initial singularity marking the origin of physical space." In addition, the paper claimed, the Foucault pendulum experiment "cannot be explained satisfactorily in either classical or relativistic mechanics". The physicists commenting on Usenet found these claims and subsequent attempts at their explanation peculiar, since the trajectory of a Foucault pendulum—a standard museum piece—is accurately predicted by classical mechanics. The Bogdanovs explained that these claims would only be clear in the context of topological field theory. Baez and Russell Blackadar attempted to determine the meaning of the "plane of oscillation" statement; after the Bogdanovs issued some elaborations, Baez concluded that it was a complicated way of rephrasing the following:

Since the big bang happened everywhere, no matter which way a pendulum swings, the plane in which it swings can be said to "intersect the big bang".

However, Baez pointed out, this statement does not in fact concern the Big Bang, and is entirely equivalent to the following:

No matter which way a pendulum swings, there is some point on the plane in which it swings.

Yet this rephrasing is itself equivalent to the following statement:

Any plane contains a point.

If this was the essence of the statement, Baez noted, it cannot be very useful in "explaining the origin of inertia".

Urs Schreiber, then a postdoctoral researcher at the University of Hamburg, noted that the mention of the Foucault pendulum was at odds with the papers' general tone, since they generally relied upon more "modern terminology". (According to George Johnson, the Foucault pendulum is "an icon of French science that would belong in any good Gallic spoof.") Schreiber identified five central ideas in the Bogdanovs' work—"'result' A" through "'result' E"—which are expressed in the jargon of statistical mechanics, topological field theory and cosmology. One bit of jargon, the Hagedorn temperature, comes from string theory, but as Schreiber notes, the paper does not use this concept in any detail; moreover, since the paper is manifestly not a string theory treatise, "considering the role the Hagedorn temperature plays in string cosmology, this is bordering on self-parody." Schreiber concludes that the fourth "result" (that the spacetime metric "at the initial singularity" must be Riemannian) contradicts the initial assumption of their argument (an FRW cosmology with pseudo-Riemannian metric). The fifth and last "result", Schreiber notes, is an attempt to resolve this contradiction by "invok[ing] quantum mechanics". The Bogdanovs themselves described Schreiber's summary as "very accurate"; for more on this point, see below. Schreiber concluded,

Just to make sure: I do not think that any of the above is valid reasoning. I am writing this just to point out what I think are the central 'ideas' the authors had when writing their articles and how this led them to their conclusions.

Eli Hawkins of Pennsylvania State University voiced a similar concern about "The KMS state of spacetime at the Planck scale".

The main result of this paper is that this thermodynamic equilibrium should be a KMS state. This almost goes without saying; for a quantum system, the KMS condition is just the concrete definition of thermodynamic equilibrium. The hard part is identifying the quantum system to which the condition should be applied, which is not done in this paper.

Both Baez and, later, Peter Woit noted that content was largely repeated from one Bogdanov paper to another.

The defining conditions of a Hopf algebra can be expressed using a commutative diagram.

Damien Calaque of the Louis Pasteur University, Strasbourg, criticized Grichka Bogdanov's unpublished preprint "Construction of cocycle bicrossproducts by twisting". In Calaque's estimation, the results presented in the preprint did not have sufficient novelty and interest to merit an independent journal article, and moreover the principal theorem was, in its current formulation, false: Grichka Bogdanov's construction yields a bialgebra which is not necessarily a Hopf algebra, the latter being a type of mathematical object which must satisfy additional conditions.

Eventually, the controversy attracted mainstream media attention, opening new avenues for physicists' comments to be disseminated. Le Monde quoted Alain Connes, recipient of the 1982 Fields Medal, as saying, "I didn't need long to convince myself that they're talking about things that they haven't mastered." The New York Times reported that the physicists David Gross, Carlo Rovelli and Lee Smolin considered the Bogdanov papers nonsensical. Nobel laureate Georges Charpak later stated on a French talk show that the Bogdanovs' presence in the scientific community was "nonexistent".

The most positive comments about the papers themselves came from string theorist Luboš Motl:

...Some of the papers of the Bogdanoff brothers are really painful and clearly silly ... But the most famous paper about the solution of the initial singularity is a bit different; it is more sophisticated.

...it does not surprise me much that Roman Jackiw said that the paper satisfied everything he expects from an acceptable paper—the knowledge of the jargon and some degree of original ideas. (And be sure that Jackiw, Kounnas, and Majid were not the only ones with this kind of a conclusion.)

...Technically, their paper connects too many things. It would be too good if all these ideas and (correct) formulae were necessary for a justification of a working solution to the initial singularity problem. But if one accepts that the papers about these difficult questions don't have to be just a well-defined science but maybe also a bit of inspiring art, the brothers have done a pretty good job, I think. And I want to know the answers to many questions that are opened in their paper.

Motl's measured support for "Topological field theory of the initial singularity of spacetime", however, stands in stark contrast to Robert Oeckl's official MathSciNet review, which states that the paper is "rife with nonsensical or meaningless statements and suffers from a serious lack of coherence," follows up with several examples to illustrate his point, and concludes that the paper "falls short of scientific standards and appears to have no meaningful content." An official report from the Centre national de la recherche scientifique (CNRS), which became public in 2010, concluded that the paper "ne peut en aucune façon être qualifié de contribution scientifique" ("cannot in any way be considered a scientific contribution"). (Note: One point noted by Schreiber, Oeckl and the CNRS report is the claim, "A theory is topological if (the Lagrangian $L$ being nontrivial) it does not depend on $L$." Oeckl calls this "plain nonsense", while the CNRS report observes that this would mean "la théorie ne dépend pas de ce qui la définit" ("the theory does not depend on that which defines it").) The CNRS report summarized the Bogdanovs' theses thusly: "Ces thèses n’ont pas de valeur scientifique. […] Rarement aura-t-on vu un travail creux habillé avec une telle sophistication" ("These theses have no scientific value. [...] Rarely have we seen a hollow work dressed with such sophistication").

== Aftermath ==
=== Claims of pseudonymous activity ===
One episode after the heyday of the affair involved the participation of an unidentified "Professor Yang". Using an e-mail address at the domain th-phys.edu.hk, an individual publishing under this name wrote to a number of individuals and on the Internet to defend the Bogdanov papers. This individual wrote to physicists John Baez, Jacques Distler and Peter Woit; to The New York Times journalist Dennis Overbye; and on numerous physics blogs and forums, signing his name "Professor L. Yang—Theoretical Physics Laboratory, International Institute of Mathematical Physics—HKU/Clear Water Bay, Kowloon, Hong Kong." It is the Hong Kong University of Science and Technology which is located in Clear Water Bay, not Hong Kong University (HKU), whose main campus is located in the Mid-Levels of Hong Kong Island.

The Bogdanovs have claimed that the "domain name 'th-phys.edu.hk' was owned by Hong Kong University." This was not confirmed officially by HKU and no Prof. Yang existed on the roster of the HKU physics department; nor did the university have an "International Institute of Mathematical Physics".

Suspicions were consequently raised that Professor L. Yang was actually a pseudonym of the Bogdanovs. However, Igor Bogdanov has maintained that Professor Yang is a real mathematical physicist with expertise in KMS theory, a friend of his, and that he was posting anonymously from Igor's apartment. (Note: Another oddity noted by Woit in Not Even Wrong is the website of the "Mathematical Center of Riemannian Cosmology" (phys-maths.edu.lv). Again, this apparent educational institution was registered by Igor Bogdanov. When asked about the Center's website, Igor Bogdanov claimed that it had been established and hosted by the University of Riga, after the brothers had attended a conference there in either 2001 or 2002.)

=== Rayons X and Avant Le Big Bang ===
In 2002, the Bogdanovs launched a new weekly TV show Rayons X (X Rays) on French public channel France 2. In August 2004, they presented a 90-minute special cosmology program in which they introduced their theory among other cosmological scenarios. The French mainstream media, in both the press and on the Internet, covered the renewed controversy to some extent; media outlets that reported upon it include Acrimed and Ciel et Espace.

The golden ratio φ, here shown as the long side of a golden rectangle, is a solution to an algebraic equation and thus not a transcendental number.

In 2004, the Bogdanovs published a commercially successful popular science book, Avant Le Big Bang (Before the Big Bang), based on a simplified version of their theses, where they also presented their point of view about the affair. Both the book and the Bogdanovs' television shows have been criticized for elementary scientific and mathematical inaccuracies. Critics cite examples from Avant Le Big Bang including a statement that the "golden number" φ (phi) is transcendental, an assumption that the limit of a decreasing sequence is always zero, and that the expansion of the Universe implies that the planets of the Solar System have grown farther apart.

In October 2004, a journalist from Ciel et Espace interviewed Shahn Majid of Queen Mary, University of London about his report on Grichka Bogdanov's thesis. Majid said that the French version of his report on Grichka's thesis was "an unauthorized translation partially invented by the Bogdanovs." In one sentence, the English word "interesting" was translated as the French "important". A "draft [mathematical] construction" became "la première construction [mathématique]" ("the first [mathematical] construction"). Elsewhere, an added word demonstrated, according to Majid, that "Bogdanov does not understand his own draft results." Majid also described more than ten other modifications of meaning, each one biased towards "surestimation outrancière"—"outrageous over-estimation". Majid said that his original report described a "very weak" student who nevertheless demonstrated "an impressive amount of determination to obtain a doctorate." Later, Majid claimed in a Usenet post that, in an addendum to Avant Le Big Bang, Grichka intentionally misquoted Majid's opinion on the way this interview had been transcribed.

Additionally, in the same addendum, a critical analysis of their work made by Urs Schreiber, and affirmed by the Bogdanovs as "very accurate", was included with the exception of the concluding remark "Just to make sure: I do not think that any of the above is valid reasoning", thus inverting the meaning from criticism into ostensible support. Moreover, a comment by physicist Peter Woit written as, "It's certainly possible that you have some new worthwhile results on quantum groups", was translated as "Il est tout à fait certain que vous avez obtenu des résultats nouveaux et utiles dans les groupes quantiques" ("It is completely certain that you have obtained new and useful results on quantum groups") and published by the Bogdanovs in the addendum of their book.

=== Disputes on French and English Wikipedias ===
At the beginning of 2004, Igor Bogdanov began to post on French Usenet physics groups and Internet forums, continuing the pattern of behavior seen on sci.physics.research. A controversy began on the French Wikipedia when Igor Bogdanov and his supporters began to edit that encyclopedia's article on the brothers, prompting the creation of a new article dedicated to the debate (Polémique autour des travaux des frères Bogdanov—"Debate surrounding the work of the Bogdanov brothers"). The dispute then spread to the English Wikipedia. In November 2005, this led the Arbitration Committee, a dispute resolution panel that acts as the project's court of last resort, to ban anyone deemed to be a participant in the external dispute from editing the English Wikipedia's article on the Bogdanov Affair. A number of English Wikipedia users, including Igor Bogdanov himself, were explicitly named in this ban. In 2006, Baez wrote on his website that for some time the Bogdanovs and "a large crowd of sock puppets" had been attempting to rewrite the English Wikipedia article on the controversy "to make it less embarrassing to them". "Nobody seems to be fooled", he added.

=== Lawsuits ===
In December 2004, the Bogdanovs sued Ciel et Espace for defamation over the publication of a critical article entitled "The Mystification of the Bogdanovs". In September 2006, the case was dismissed after the Bogdanovs missed court deadlines; they were ordered to pay 2,500 euros to the magazine's publisher to cover its legal costs. There was never a substantive ruling on whether the Bogdanovs had been defamed.

Alain Riazuelo, an astrophysicist at the Institut d'astrophysique de Paris, participated in many of the online discussions of the Bogdanovs' work. He posted an unpublished version of Grichka Bogdanov's PhD thesis on his personal website, along with his critical analysis. Bogdanov subsequently described this version as "dating from 1991 and too unfinished to be made public". Rather than suing Riazuelo for defamation, Bogdanov filed a criminal complaint of copyright (droit d'auteur) violation against him in May 2011. The police detained and interrogated Riazuelo. He came to trial and was convicted in March 2012. A fine of 2,000 euros the court imposed was suspended, and only one euro of damages was awarded. But in passing judgement the court stated that the scientist had "lacked prudence", given "the fame of the plaintiff".

The verdict outraged many scientists, who felt that the police and courts should have no say in a discussion of the scientific merits of a piece of work. In April 2012, a group of 170 scientists published an open letter titled L'affaire Bogdanoff: Liberté, Science et Justice, Des scientifiques revendiquent leur droit au blâme (The Bogdanov Affair: Liberty, Science and Justice, scientists claim their right of critique).

In 2014, the Bogdanovs sued the weekly magazine Marianne for defamation, on account of reporting the magazine had published in 2010 which had brought the CNRS report to light. The weekly publication was eventually ordered to pay 64,000 euros in damages, a quantity less than the Bogdanovs had originally demanded (in excess of 800,000 euros each). The Bogdanovs also sued the CNRS for 1.2 million euros in damages, claiming that the CNRS report had "porté atteinte à leur honneur, à leur réputation et à leur crédit" ("undermined their honor, reputation and credit") and calling the report committee a "Stasi scientifique", but a tribunal ruled against them in 2015 and ordered them to pay 2,000 euros.

=== Megatrend University ===
In 2005, the Bogdanovs became professors at Megatrend University in Belgrade where they were appointed Chairs of Cosmology and said to direct the Megatrend Laboratory of Cosmology. Mića Jovanović, the rector and owner of Megatrend University, wrote a preface for the Serbian edition of Avant le Big Bang. Jovanović later became embroiled in controversy and resigned his post when it was revealed that he had not obtained a PhD at the London School of Economics as he had claimed. This scandal, combined with the presence of the Bogdanovs, contributed to an atmosphere of controversy surrounding Megatrend.

=== L'équation Bogdanov ===
In 2008, Presses de la Renaissance published L'équation Bogdanov: le secret de l'origine de l'univers? (The Bogdanov Equation: The Secret of the Origin of the Universe?), officially written in English by Luboš Motl and translated into French. A review in Science et Vie found that the book was light on detail and never actually said what the "Bogdanov equation" is: "Et arrivé à la conclusion, on n'est même plus très certain qu'elle existe réellement" ("Arriving at the conclusion, one is no longer even very certain that it really exists").

== Reflections upon the peer-review system ==
During the heyday of this affair, some media coverage cast a negative light on theoretical physics, stating or at least strongly implying that it has become impossible to distinguish a valid paper from a hoax. Overbye's article in The New York Times voiced this opinion, for example, as did Declan Butler's piece in Nature. Posters on blogs and Usenet used the affair to criticize the present status of string theory; for the same reason, Peter Woit devoted a chapter of Not Even Wrong, a book emphatically critical of string theory, to the affair. On the other hand, George Johnson's report in The New York Times concludes that physicists have generally decided the papers are "probably just the result of fuzzy thinking, bad writing and journal referees more comfortable with correcting typos than challenging thoughts." String theorist Aaron Bergman riposted in a review of Not Even Wrong that Woit's conclusion

is undermined by a number of important elisions in the telling of the story, the most important of which is that the writings of the Bogdanovs, to the extent that one can make sense of them, have almost nothing to do with string theory. ... I first learned of the relevant papers in a posting on the internet by Dr. John Baez. Having found a copy of one of the relevant papers available online, I posted that "the referee clearly didn't even glance at it." While the papers were full of rather abstruse prose about a wide variety of technical areas, it was easy to identify outright nonsense in the areas about which I had some expertise. ... A pair of non-string theorists were able to get nonsensical papers generally not about string theory published in journals not generally used by string theorists. This is surely an indictment of something, but its relevance to string theory is marginal at best.

Jacques Distler argued that the tone of the media coverage had more to do with journalistic practices than with physics.

The much-anticipated New York Times article on the Bogdanov scandal has appeared. Alas, it suffers from the usual journalistic conceit that a proper newspaper article must cover a "controversy". There must be two sides to the controversy, and the reporter's job is to elicit quotes from both parties and present them side-by-side. Almost inevitably, this "balanced" approach sheds no light on the matter, and leaves the reader shaking his head, "There they go again..."

Distler also suggested that the fact that the Bogdanovs had not uploaded their papers to the arXiv prior to publication, as was standard practice by that time, meant that the physics community must have paid vanishingly little attention to those papers before the hoax rumors broke.

The affair prompted many comments about the possible shortcomings of the referral system for published articles, and also on the criteria for acceptance of a PhD thesis. Frank Wilczek, who edited Annals of Physics (and who would later share the 2004 Nobel Prize in Physics), told the press that the scandal motivated him to correct the journal's slipping standards, partly by assigning more reviewing duties to the editorial board.

Prior to the controversy, the reports on the Bogdanov theses and most of the journal referees' reports spoke favorably of their work, describing it as original and containing interesting ideas. This has been the basis of concerns raised about the efficacy of the peer-review system that the scientific community and academia use to determine the merit of submitted manuscripts for publication; one concern is that over-worked and unpaid referees may not be able to thoroughly judge the value of a paper in the little time they can afford to spend on it. Regarding the Bogdanov publications, physicist Steve Carlip remarked:

Referees are volunteers, who as a whole put in a great deal of work for no credit, no money, and little or no recognition, for the good of the community. Sometimes a referee makes a mistake. Sometimes two referees make mistakes at the same time.

I'm a little surprised that anyone is surprised at this. Surely you've seen bad papers published in good journals before this! ... referees give opinions; the real peer review begins after a paper is published.

Similarly, Richard Monastersky, writing in The Chronicle of Higher Education, observed, "There is one way...for physicists to measure the importance of the Bogdanovs' work. If researchers find merit in the twins' ideas, those thoughts will echo in the references of scientific papers for years to come." Before the controversy over their work arose, the scientific community had shown practically no interest in the Bogdanovs' papers; indeed, according to Stony Brook physics professor Jacobus Verbaarschot, who served on Igor Bogdanov's dissertation committee, without the hoax rumors "probably no one would have ever known about their articles." As of October 2018, the Bogdanovs' most recent paper was "Thermal Equilibrium and KMS Condition at the Planck Scale", which was submitted to the Chinese Annals of Mathematics in 2001 and appeared in 2003. That journal ceased publication in 2005. One retrospective commented,

Up to 2007 the databanks mention a total of six citations for the Bogdanovs' publications. Four of them are citations among themselves and only two are by other physicists.

== Sokal affair comparison ==
Several sources have referred to the Bogdanov affair as a "reverse Sokal" hoax, drawing a comparison with the Sokal affair, where the physicist Alan Sokal published a deliberately fraudulent and indeed nonsensical article in the humanities journal Social Text. Worried by what he considered a "more-or-less explicit rejection of the rationalist tradition of the Enlightenment", Sokal originally indented to test the effects of the intellectual trend he called, "for want of a better term, postmodernism". The affair provoked a variety of reactions, which received coverage in Le Monde and even the front page of The New York Times.

The physicist John Baez compared the two events in his October 2002 post to the sci.physics.research newsgroup. Sociologist of science Harry Collins noted that all of the early reports of the incident made reference to the Sokal affair, and he speculated that without Sokal's precedent bringing the idea of hoax publications to mind, the Bogdanov papers would have sunk into the general obscurity of non-influential scientific writing.

Igor and Grichka Bogdanov have and had vigorously insisted upon the validity of their work, while in contrast, Sokal was an outsider to the field in which he was publishing—a physicist, publishing in a humanities journal—and promptly issued a statement himself that his paper was a deliberate hoax. Replying on sci.physics.research, Sokal referred readers to his follow-up essay, in which he notes "the mere fact of publication of my parody" only proved that the editors of one particular journal—and a "rather marginal" one at that—had applied a lax intellectual standard. (According to The New York Times, Sokal was "almost disappointed" that the Bogdanovs had not attempted a hoax after his own style. "What's sauce for the goose is sauce for the gander", he said.) Baez, who made a comparison between the two affairs, later retracted, saying that the brothers "have lost too much face for [withdrawing the work as a hoax] to be a plausible course of action".

In a letter to The New York Times, Cornell physics professor Paul Ginsparg wrote that the contrast between the cases was plainly evident: "here, the authors were evidently aiming to be credentialed by the intellectual prestige of the discipline rather than trying to puncture any intellectual pretension." He added that the fact some journals and scientific institutions have low or variable standards is "hardly a revelation". The observation was later confirmed by studies showing that high-prestige journals struggle to reach average reliability.

== See also ==
- List of topics characterized as pseudoscience
