= Igor and Grichka Bogdanoff =

French TV presenters, producers and essayists

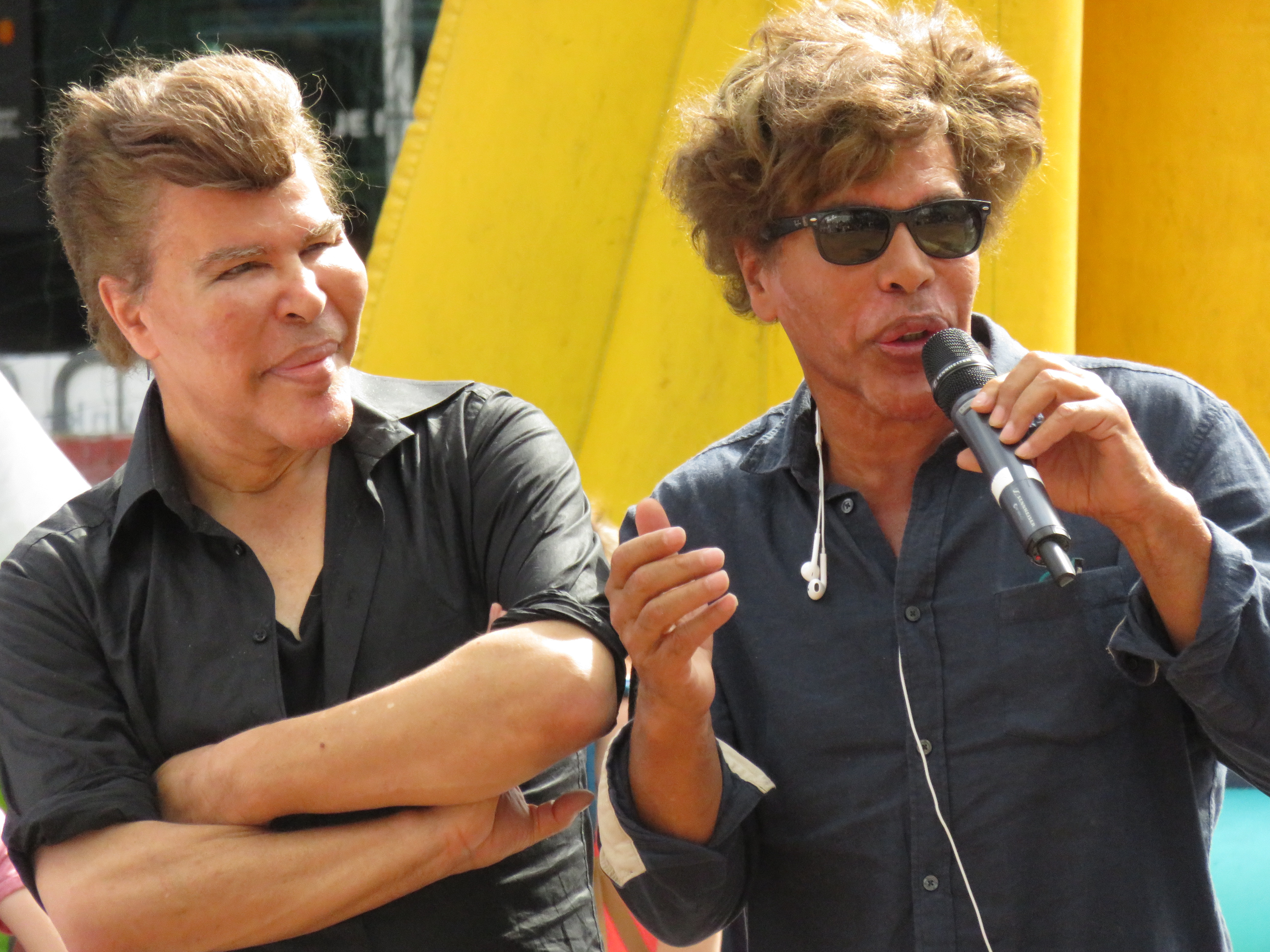
- Igor (left) and Grichka in 2016
- Born: Igor Youriévitch Bogdanoff; Grégoire Youriévitch Bogdanoff; 29 August 1949; Saint-Lary, Gers, France
- Died: Igor: 3 January 2022 (aged 72); Grichka: 28 December 2021 (aged 72); Paris, France
- Other names: Bogdanoff twins; Bogdanov twins
- Occupation: Media personalities
- Years active: 1976–2022
- Known for: Popular science; Bogdanov affair
- Scientific career
- Education: University of Burgundy
- Fields: Theoretical physics
- Thesis: Fluctuations quantiques de la signature de la métrique à l'échelle de Planck (1999)
- Doctoral advisor: Moshé Flato, Daniel Sternheimer

Igor Youriévitch Bogdanoff (French pronunciation: [iɡɔʁ juʁi.evitʃ bɔɡdanɔf]; 29 August 1949 – 3 January 2022) and Grégoire "Grichka" Youriévitch Bogdanoff (French: [ɡʁeɡwaʁ ɡʁiʃka]; 29 August 1949 – 28 December 2021), alternatively spelled Bogdanov, were French television presenters, producers, and essayists who presented a variety of programmes in science fiction, popular science, and cosmology. The brothers – identical twins – were involved in a number of controversies, the most notable being the Bogdanov affair. It brought to light how they received Ph.D. degrees based on largely nonsensical physics papers that were nonetheless peer-reviewed and published in reputable scientific journals. In their later years, they were also the subject of numerous internet memes, particularly in the cryptocurrency community.

== Early life and disputed claims about ancestry ==
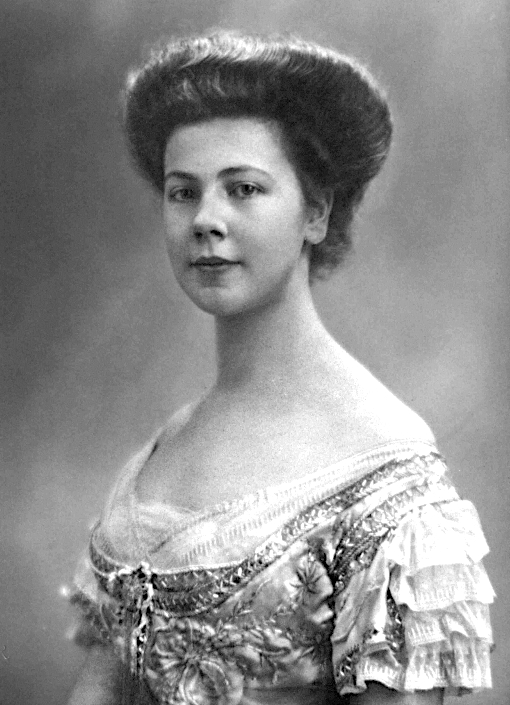
The twins' maternal grandmother, Countess Bertha Kolowrat-Krakowská

The identical twin brothers Igor and Grichka Bogdanoff were born to Maria "Maya" Dolores Franzyska Kolowrat-Krakowská (1926–1982), of Bohemian and Polish descent, and Yuri "Youri" Mikhaïlovitch Bogdanoff (1928–2012), an itinerant Russian emigré farm worker and later painter; Igor was born 40 minutes before Grichka. The twins' parents divorced shortly after their birth, and they were mainly raised by their maternal grandmother Bertha Kolowrat-Krakowská at her castle in Saint-Lary. Their mother was born from an extramarital affair between Bertha (at the time married to Count Hieronymus Colloredo-Mannsfeld) and African-American tenor Roland Hayes; their affair caused a major scandal and cost Bertha her title, access to her four elder children, palatial homes in Berlin and Prague, as well as her status in European high society. Bertha tried to sustain her relationship with Hayes after her divorce and his return to the United States, but declined his offer to legally adopt and raise their daughter.

The Bogdanoff twins made many grandiose and unsubstantiated claims about their early lives and ancestry: they claimed to have received IQ scores above 190 as children, and that their father was "the descendant of a prince, the right arm of Tsar Peter the Great" with ancestral links to a noble Muslim Tatar Mirza from Penza that converted to Orthodox Christianity in exchange for a royal title from Tsar Feodor III. Genealogist William Addams Reitwiesner found little evidence for this, noting that "Other than a statement by Dr. Stanislaus Dumin (included in a message posted by the twins on 7 January 2005 to the alt.talk.royalty Usenet newsgroup) there isn't much evidence to support this claim."

They made similarly grandiose claims about how their parents met, claiming that Yuri was "a young artist (...) (who) followed 'a solid training as a painter as a free auditor at the Beaux-Arts'", and that "a 'famous writer' (...) introduced Yuri to their grandmother." These claims were the subject of extensive research by journalist Maud Guillaumin for the novel Le mystère Bogdanoff (L'Archipel, 2019), who concluded that the claims were rife with "approximations and historical inaccuracies": in reality, Guillaumin found out that Yuri Bogdanoff, in his teenage years, had first travelled to Spain from the Soviet Union and found himself unable to return on account of being declared a spy and imprisoned. Contrary to the twins' claims, their father had instead begun "a life of wandering from farm to Pyrenean farm" as a labourer after arriving in France before eventually finding employment at Bertha's castle residence in 1948, which is where he met Maya. In an interview with the twins' godmother, Monique David, it was further established by Guillaumin that the twins' mother was already pregnant at the time of her marriage to Yuri, and that Bertha considered them an unworthy match. She "chased him away", leading to their subsequent divorce and his absence from the twins' lives until they were ten years old.

== Television shows ==
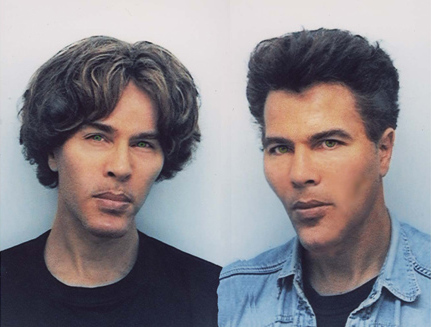
Grichka (left) and Igor in the 1990s

The brothers began careers in television, hosting several popular programs on science and science fiction. The first of these, Temps X (Time X), ran from 1979 to 1989 and introduced several British and American science-fiction series to the French public, including Star Trek, and Doctor Who, in addition to featuring musical guests such as Jean-Michel Jarre.

In 2002, the Bogdanoffs launched a new weekly television show, Rayons X, on the French public channel France 2. In August 2004, they presented a 90-minute special cosmology program.

== Academic careers ==
Grichka Bogdanoff received a Ph.D. degree in mathematics from the University of Burgundy (Dijon) in 1999. In 2002, Igor Bogdanoff received a Ph.D. in theoretical physics from the University of Burgundy. Both brothers received the lowest passing grade of "honorable" rather than the more usual "très honorable".

=== Bogdanov affair ===
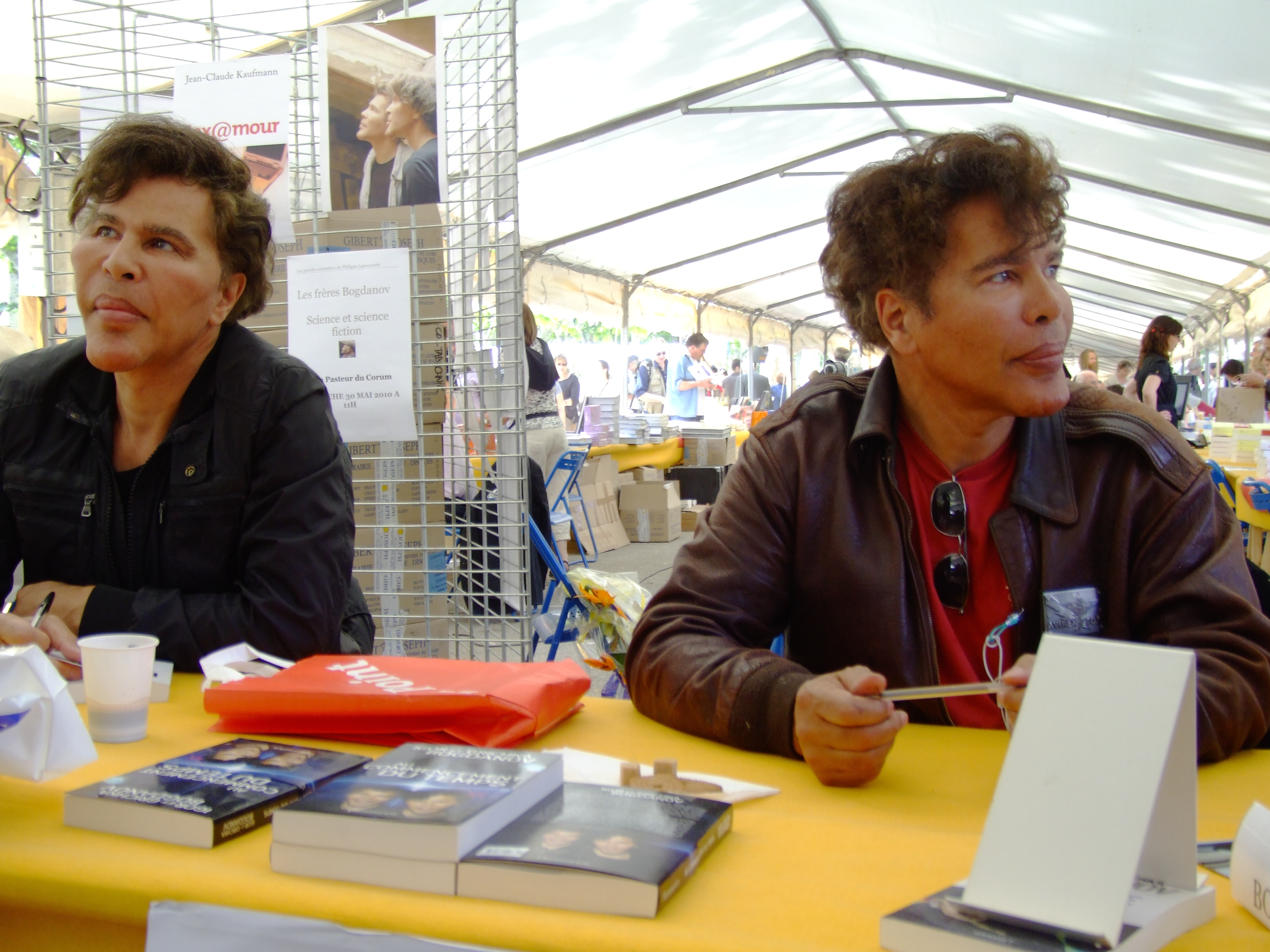
Igor (left) and Grichka Bogdanoff in 2010

In 2001 and 2002, the brothers published five papers (including "Topological field theory of the initial singularity of spacetime") in peer-reviewed physics journals. Controversy over the Bogdanoffs' work began on 22 October 2002, with an email sent by University of Tours physicist Max Niedermaier to University of Pittsburgh physicist Ezra T. Newman. Niedermaier suggested that the Bogdanoffs' Ph.D. theses and papers were "spoof[s]", created by throwing together instances of theoretical-physics jargon, including terminology from string theory: "The abstracts are delightfully meaningless combinations of buzzwords ... which apparently have been taken seriously."

Copies of the email reached American mathematical physicist John C. Baez, and on 23 October he created a discussion thread about the Bogdanoffs' work on the Usenet newsgroup sci.physics.research, titled "Physics bitten by reverse Alan Sokal hoax?" Baez was comparing the Bogdanoffs' publications to the 1996 Sokal affair, in which physicist Alan Sokal successfully submitted an intentionally nonsensical paper to a cultural studies journal in order to criticize that field's lax standards for discussing science. The Bogdanoffs quickly became a popular discussion topic, with most respondents agreeing that the papers were flawed.

The story spread in public media, prompting Niedermaier to apologize to the Bogdanoffs, admitting that he had not read the papers himself. The Bogdanoffs' background in entertainment lent some plausibility to the idea that they were attempting a deliberate hoax, but Igor Bogdanoff quickly denied the accusation.

In October 2002, the Bogdanoffs released an email containing apparently supportive statements by Laurent Freidel, then a visiting professor at the Perimeter Institute for Theoretical Physics. Soon after, Freidel denied writing any such remarks, telling the press that he had forwarded a message containing that text to a friend.

The online discussion was quickly followed by media attention. The Register reported on the dispute on 1 November 2002, and stories in The Chronicle of Higher Education, Nature, The New York Times, and other publications appeared soon after. These news stories included commentary by physicists.

One of the scientists who approved Igor Bogdanoff's thesis, Roman Jackiw of the Massachusetts Institute of Technology, spoke to The New York Times reporter Dennis Overbye. Overbye wrote that Jackiw was intrigued by the thesis, although it contained many points he did not understand. Jackiw defended the thesis. In contrast, Ignatios Antoniadis (of the École Polytechnique), who approved Grichka Bogdanoff's thesis, later reversed his judgment of it. Antoniadis told Le Monde:

I had given a favorable opinion for Grichka's defense, based on a rapid and indulgent reading of the thesis text. Alas, I was completely mistaken. The scientific language was just an appearance behind which hid incompetence and ignorance of even basic physics.

The journal Classical and Quantum Gravity (CQG) published one of the Bogdanoffs' papers, titled "Topological field theory of the initial singularity of spacetime"; Ian Russell, assistant director of its journals division, later issued a statement that "we deployed our standard peer-review process on that paper." After the article's publication and the publicity surrounding the controversy, mathematician Greg Kuperberg posted to Usenet a statement written by the journal's senior publisher, Andrew Wray, and its co-editor, Hermann Nicolai. The statement read, in part:

Regrettably, despite the best efforts, the refereeing process cannot be 100% effective. Thus the paper ... made it through the review process even though, in retrospect, it does not meet the standards expected of articles in this journal... The paper was discussed extensively at the annual Editorial Board meeting ... and there was general agreement that it should not have been published. Since then several steps have been taken to further improve the peer review process in order to improve the quality assessment on articles submitted to the journal and reduce the likelihood that this could happen again.

The statement was quoted in The New York Times, The Chronicle of Higher Education, and Nature. Moreover, Die Zeit quoted Nicolai as saying that had the paper reached his desk, he would have immediately rejected it.

The Chinese Journal of Physics published Igor Bogdanoff's "The KMS state of spacetime at the Planck scale", while Nuovo Cimento published "KMS space-time at the Planck scale". According to physicist Arun Bala, these papers "involved purported applications of quantum theory to understand processes at the dawn of the universe" but turned out to be a "hoax perpetrated on the physics community."

Eli Hawkins, acting as a referee on behalf of the Journal of Physics A, suggested rejecting one of the Bogdanoffs' papers: "It would take up too much space to enumerate all the mistakes: indeed it is difficult to say where one error ends and the next begins."

Eventually, the controversy attracted mainstream media attention, opening new avenues for physicists' comments to be disseminated. Le Monde quoted Alain Connes, recipient of the 1982 Fields Medal, as saying, "I didn't need long to convince myself that they're talking about things that they haven't mastered." The New York Times reported that the physicists David Gross, Carlo Rovelli, and Lee Smolin considered the Bogdanoff papers nonsensical. Nobel laureate Georges Charpak later said on a French talk show that the Bogdanoffs' presence in the scientific community was "nonexistent".

Robert Oeckl's official MathSciNet review of "Topological field theory of the initial singularity of spacetime" says that the paper is "rife with nonsensical or meaningless statements and suffers from a serious lack of coherence", gives several examples to illustrate his point, and concludes that the paper "falls short of scientific standards and appears to have no meaningful content." An official report from the Centre national de la recherche scientifique (CNRS), which became public in 2010, concluded that the paper "ne peut en aucune façon être qualifié de contribution scientifique" ("cannot in any way be considered a scientific contribution").

The CNRS report summarized the Bogdanoffs' theses thus: "Ces thèses n’ont pas de valeur scientifique. […] Rarement aura-t-on vu un travail creux habillé avec une telle sophistication" ("These theses have no scientific value. [...] Rarely have we seen a hollow work dressed with such sophistication").

=== Lawsuits ===
On 30 December 2004, the Bogdanoffs sued Ciel et Espace for defamation over the publication of a critical article titled "The Mystification of the Bogdanoffs". In September 2006, the case was dismissed after the Bogdanoffs missed court deadlines; they were ordered to pay €2,500 to the magazine's publisher to cover its legal costs. There was never a substantive ruling on whether the Bogdanoffs had been defamed.

Alain Riazuelo, an astrophysicist at the Institut d'Astrophysique de Paris, participated in many of the online discussions of the Bogdanoffs' work. He posted an unpublished version of Grichka Bogdanoff's Ph.D. thesis on his personal website, along with his critical analysis. Bogdanoff subsequently described this version as "dating from 1991 and too unfinished to be made public". Rather than suing Riazuelo for defamation, Bogdanoff filed a criminal complaint of copyright (droit d'auteur) violation against him in May 2011.

The police detained and interrogated Riazuelo. He was convicted in March 2012. A fine of €2,000 the court imposed was suspended, and only €1.00 of damages was awarded, but in passing judgment the court said that the scientist had "lacked prudence", given "the fame of the plaintiff".

The verdict outraged many scientists, who felt that the police and courts should have no say in a discussion of the scientific merits of a piece of work. In April 2012, a group of 170 scientists published an open letter titled L'affaire Bogdanoff: Liberté, Science et Justice, Des scientifiques revendiquent leur droit au blâme (The Bogdanoff Affair: Liberty, Science and Justice, scientists claim their right of critique).

In 2014, the Bogdanoffs sued the weekly magazine Marianne for defamation, on account of reporting the magazine had published in 2010 that had brought the CNRS report to light. The magazine was eventually ordered to pay €64,000 in damages, much less than the €800,000 each that the Bogdanoffs originally demanded. The Bogdanoffs also sued the CNRS for €1.2 million in damages, claiming that the CNRS report had "porté atteinte à leur honneur, à leur réputation et à leur crédit" ("undermined their honor, reputation and credit") and calling the report committee a "Stasi scientifique", but a tribunal ruled against them in 2015 and ordered them to pay €2,000.

=== Megatrend University ===
In 2005, the Bogdanoffs became professors at Megatrend University, a diploma mill from Belgrade, where they were appointed to Chairs of Cosmology and made directors of the 'Megatrend Laboratory of Cosmology'. Mića Jovanović, the rector and owner of Megatrend University, wrote a preface for the Serbian edition of Avant le Big Bang. Jovanović himself later became embroiled in controversy and resigned his post when he was found out to not have obtained a Ph.D. at the London School of Economics, as he had claimed. This scandal, combined with the presence of the Bogdanoffs, contributed to an atmosphere of controversy surrounding Megatrend.

== Personal lives and deaths ==
The Bogdanoff twins became known for their changing physical appearances over the years, with prominent cheekbones and elongated chins. However, they denied having undergone plastic surgery, In 2010, The Sydney Morning Herald described the twins' cheekbones as "so high and bulbous as to appear to threaten their owners' vision", adding that the twins' appearance at the Cannes Film Festival had "caused a stir around the world". The Herald noted how the twins' cheekbones had become noticeably larger in the 1990s, and that "growth in their lips and chins continued unabated through the last decade". According to the brothers' friend Luc Ferry, they had both received botox injections for cosmetic treatment.

The twins became popular Internet memes, especially among enthusiasts of cryptocurrency, jokingly depicting the Bogdanoffs as "all-powerful market makers". Their status as "crypto memes" was covered by several outlets upon their deaths, including CNN, Business Insider, and The Daily Telegraph. The twins "went along with their meme fame", according to Business Insider, and said they predicted cryptocurrency in the 1980s on Temps X.

Besides French, they spoke German, Russian, and English.

Igor Bogdanoff had six children, four from his first marriage and two from his second. His second wife was Princess Amélie of Bourbon-Parma, daughter of Prince Michel of Bourbon-Parma. They married civilly in Paris on 1 October 2009, with a religious ceremony in Chambord two days later. Grichka was in a relationship with a woman named Chaymae at the time of his death, but never married and had no children. The twins declared having been diagnosed with Asperger syndrome, but that has not been confirmed.

=== Deaths ===
The Bogdanoff twins were both hospitalized, at the Georges Pompidou European Hospital in Paris, in critical condition on 15 December 2021, after contracting COVID-19. Grichka died on 28 December, and Igor on 3 January 2022. They were 72 and both intentionally unvaccinated. The funeral for both twins was held on 10 January 2022, in the Church of the Madeleine, in Paris, France.

== Publications ==
The Bogdanoff brothers published a number of works in science fiction, philosophy and popular science. Since 1991, they signed their books as "Bogdanov", preferring "v" to "ff".

- Clefs pour la science-fiction (essay), Éditions Seghers, 378 p., Paris, 1976, BNF:34707099q.
- L'Effet science-fiction: à la recherche d'une définition (essay), Éditions Robert Laffont, Paris, 1979, 423 p., ISBN 978-2-221-00411-1, BNF:34650185 g.
- Chroniques du "Temps X" (preface by Gérard Klein), Éditions du Guépard, Paris, 1981, 247 p., ISBN 978-2-86527-030-9, BNF: 34734883f.
- La Machine fantôme, Éditions J'ai lu, 1985, 251 p., ISBN 978-2-277-21921-7, BNF:34842073t.
- La Mémoire double (novel), first as hardcover on Éditions Hachette, Paris, 1985, 381 p., ISBN 978-2-01-011494-6, BNF:348362498; then as pocket book
- Dieu et la science: vers le métaréalisme (interviews with Jean Guitton): Hardcover Éditions Grasset, Paris, 1991, 195 p., ISBN 978-2-246-42411-6, BNF: 35458968t; then as a pocketbook
- Avant le Big Bang: la création du monde (essay), 2004
- Voyage vers l'Instant Zéro, Éditions EPA, Paris, 2006, 185 p., ISBN 978-2-85120-635-0, BNF: 40986028h.
- Nous ne sommes pas seuls dans l'univers, Éditions EPA, Paris, 2007, 191 p., ISBN 978-2-85120-664-0, BNF: 411885989.
- Au commencement du temps, Éditions Flammarion, Paris, 2009, 317 p., ISBN 978-2-08-120832-2, BNF: 420019981.
- Le Visage de Dieu, (with a preface by Robert Woodrow Wilson and endnotes by Jim Peebles, Robert Woodrow Wilson and John Mather, Éditions Grasset, Paris, May 2010, 282 p., ISBN 978-2-246-77231-6, BNF: 42207600f.
- Le Dernier Jour des dinosaures Éditions de la Martinière, Octobre 2011, ISBN 978-2732447100
- La Pensée de Dieu, (with endnotes by Luis Gonzalez-Mestres), Éditions Grasset, Paris, June 2012, ISBN 978-2-246-78509-5
- Le mystère du satellite Planck (Qu'y avait-il avant le Big Bang ?) (with preface and endnotes by Luis Gonzalez-Mestres, Éditions Eyrolles, June 2013, ISBN 978-2-212-55732-9
- La Fin du hasard, Éditions Grasset, Paris, Octobre 2013, ISBN 978-2-246-80990-6
- 3 minutes pour comprendre la grande théorie du Big Bang (preface by John Mather, end notes by Luis Gonzalez-Mestres, Éditions Le Courrier du Livre, October 2014, ISBN 978-2702911211

== Sources ==
- Luboš Motl, L'équation Bogdanoff: le secret de l'origine de l'univers?, translated from English by Sonia Quémener, Marc Lenoir and Laurent Martein; Preface by Clóvis de Matos, Presses de la Renaissance, Paris, 2008, 237 pp., ISBN 978-2-7509-0386-2, BnF 411908225
