= Folz =

Folz is a surname. Notable people with the surname include:

- Art Foltz (1903–1965), American football player
- Hans Folz (c. 1437–1513), German author
- Jean-Martin Folz (born 1947), French businessman
- Richard E. Folz (1922–1973), American politician
- Robert Folz (1910–1996), French medievalist
- Roger C. Folz (1928-2014), American businessman
