= Kolowrat-Krakowsky family =

Famous historical Czech family

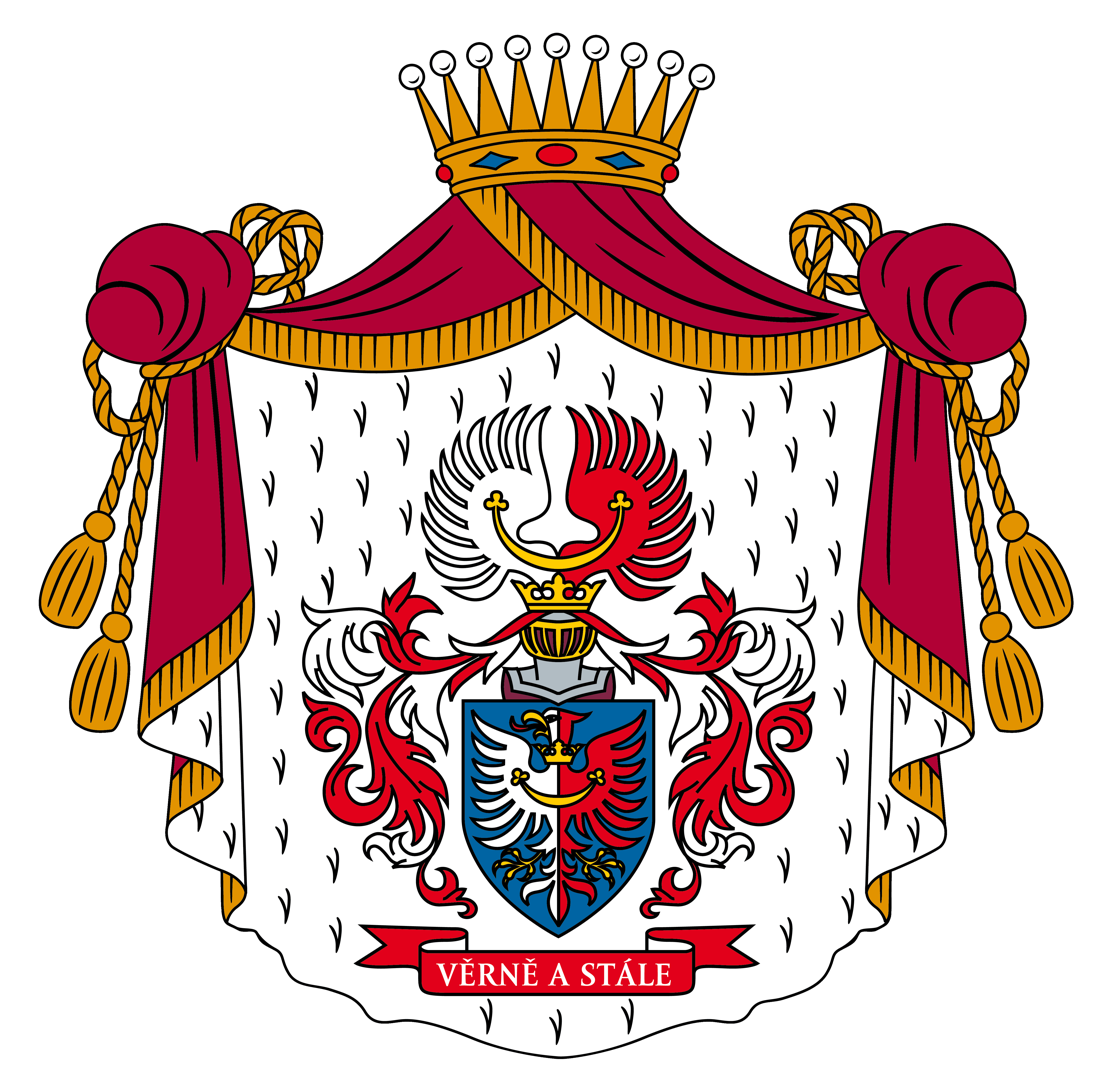
Coat of arms of the family

The Kolowrat-Krakowsky family (Czech: Kolowrat-Krakowští or Krakovští z Kolovrat) is an old Bohemian noble family from Central Europe. It is a branch of the Kolowrat family.

== History ==
The Kolowrat family originated in the 13th century, in what is today the Central Bohemian Region of the Czech Republic.

The Kolowrat-Krakowsky branch of the Kolowrat family still exists today in the Czech Republic and the United States. Over the past 600 years, this family branch has produced:

- patrons of the arts, culture, education
- merchants and business owners
- holders of inherited imperial and Bohemian titles, including knighthoods in the Order of the Golden Fleece and the Order of Malta
- field marshals, prime ministers, High Chancellors, royal governors, governors, ambassadors, archbishops and supporters of the Czech National Revival movement.

== Early history ==
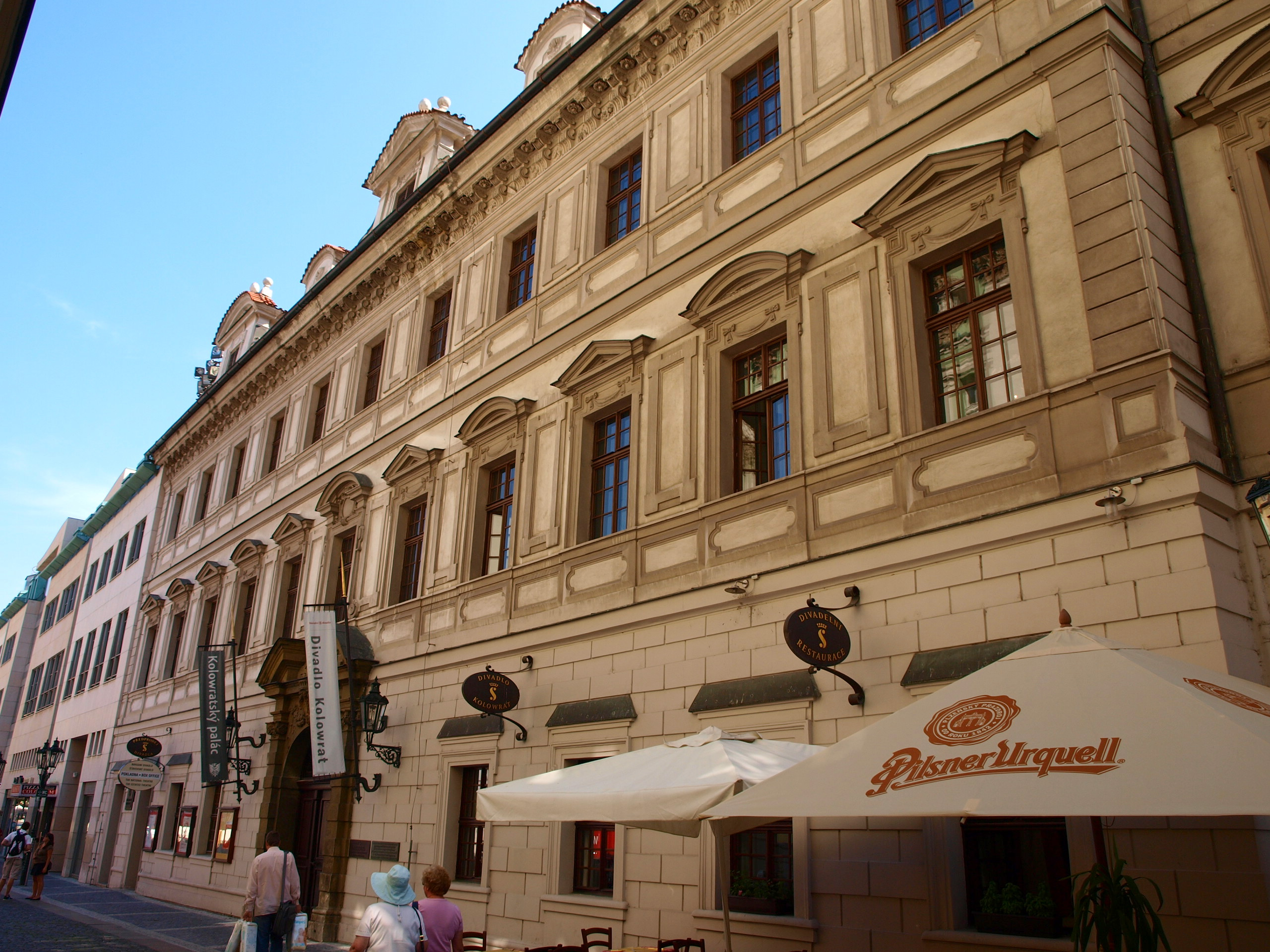

=== The three Albrechts ===
Albrecht the Elder of Kolowrat is considered the founder of the Kolowrat family. He was born in the 13th or 14th century in the village of Kolovraty in what is today the Czech Republic, hence the name "Kolowrat". Albrecht served as a hetman, a court marshal of Anna of Schweidnitz, and an assessor of the provincial and royal feudal court. In 1347, when Rožmitál pod Třemšínem Castle was sold, Albrecht was mentioned as an assessing witness. He married three times and had eight children. Albrecht's six sons laid the foundation of the Kolowrat family.

In 1373, Albrecht the Younger established an Augustinian monastery of the Assumption in Ročov, where he was later buried. Albrecht I (1422–1470) acquired Krakovec castle near what is today Krakovec, Czech Republic. The name "Krakowsky" derives from the castle name. Albrecht was the founder of the Kolowrat-Krakowský branch.

=== Leopold Vilém and sons ===
A much later descendent, Count Leopold Vilém (1727–1809), was a close friend of the Hapsburg Empress Maria Theresa and a holder of the Order of the Golden Fleece. Vilém married twice and had 17 children,

Count František Xaver (1783–1855), Vilém's youngest son, is the common ancestor of all living Kolowrat-Krakowsky descendents.

- Xaver's eldest son Leopold (1804–1884) established the "Týn" lineage, also known as "Leopold's". His descendants manage the forests around Tachov and Klatovy, as well as own property in Prague.
- Xaver's second son Theodor (1806–1875) established the "Rychnovian" lineage, also known as "Theodor's". They, reside close to Rychnov nad Kněžnou and currently use the combined family name Kolowrat-Krakowsky Libštejnský. Their residence in Rychnovsko is administered by Jan Egon Kolowrat-Krakowsky Libštejnský, the son of Count Kryštof Jaroslav Kolowrat-Krakowsky Libštejnský, who, after 1989, returned from exile in Austria.

== Modern history ==
=== Leopold Filip and Sascha Kolowrat-Krakowsky ===
Leopold Filip Kolowrat-Krakowsky (1852–1910) became the administrator of the family property in the second half of the 19th century. He was a member of the Imperial Council of the Austro-Hungarian Emprire and later served in the Bohemian Assembly. Leopold Filip was a Second Class Knight of the Order of the Iron Crown. Apart from the Přimda estate and the estate in Klatovsko, he also administered the Kolowrat Palace and the New Kolowrat Palace in Prague.

Alexander Kolowrat-Krakowsky (1886–1927), Leopold Filip's oldest son, inherited the Kolowrat-Krakowsky estate. Alexander, called Sascha, was a successful car and motorcycle racing driver but also a film producer. Sascha founded the Sascha-Film company, which discovered actor Marlene Dietrich. As a racing driver, Sascha received many awards and became the right hand of car builder Václav Klement. In Sascha's honor, an annual gathering of antique cars, is held in Přimda.

=== Jindřich Kolowrat-Krakowsky ===
When Sascha died of cancer in 1927, his brother, Jindřich Vilém Kolowrat-Krakowsky (1897–1996), became administrator of the family estate. A builder, Jindřich erected the Functionalist-styled Palace Chicago in Prague. He founded the Wooden Houses Kolowrat company, where he employed 600 permanent workers.

In 1943, the German-controlled government of Czechoslovakia nationalized the Kolowrat-Krakowsky estate, removing it from Jindřich's control After the end of World War II in 1945, Edvard Beneš, President of the new Czechoslovak government, returned the estate to Jindřich. He would serve as ambassador to as the Czechoslovak ambassador to Turkey until 1948, when he emigrated with his family to the United States.

In February 1948, the new Czechoslovak Socialist Republic nationalised the Kolowrat-Krakowsky estate again. In 1950, the government dissolved the Wooden Houses Kolowrat. In 1960, the Diana hunting lodge owned by the family was converted into a retirement home.

In 1992, after the fall of the communist regime in 1989, the Kolowrat-Krakowsky estate was returned to the Kolowrat-Krakowsky family. Jindřich and his youngest son, František Tomáš Kolowrat-Krakowsky (1943–2004) returned to Czechoslovia. In 1991, Jindřich had received the Order of Tomáš Garrigue Masaryk, Second Class, from President Václav Havel. In 1993, Jindřich rented the Kolowrat Palace to the National Theatre in Prague for one Czech Crown per year.

=== František Kolowrat-Krakowsky ===
After Jindřich died in 1996 at age 98, František became his successor. He was the only one of Jindřich's children who returned permanently to the Czech Republic.

František repaired the Hraničky Ponds and the Václavský Pond, which came to be used in the Přimda Triathlon. He built private wood roads that became cycle paths that connect different areas of the Upper Palatine Forest. In an effort to increase tourism and develop Přimda, František bought the ruins of Přimda castle and converted it into Mountain Hotel Kolowrat.

In 1997, František bought three new bells for the Roman St. George's Church in Přimda, as the original bells had been destroyed after World War II. He made a significant donation to the Czech Red Cross after flooding in the Czech Republic in 2002. František supported other charities, schools and cultural organizations.

In 2001, the Forestry of František Tomáš Kolowrat-Krakowsky was ranked in the top 100 companies of agricultural production, food industry and forestry. He was recognized by Comenius – the Pan-European Society for Culture, Education and Scientific and Technical Cooperation.

František died prematurely in 2004. After his death, Dominika Kolowrat-Krakowska became the new administrator of the family property.

== Important personalities ==
- Albrecht the older Lord of Kolowraty (died 1391), Founder of the St. Augustine's order's monastery in Dolní Ročov
- Albrecht the younger Lord of Kolowraty (mentioned 1369–1416), co-founder of the Augustinian monastery in Dolní Ročov
- Albrecht I. Lord of Kolowrat (mentioned 1422–1470), Associate of the Feudal court
- Jindřich Albrecht Lord of Kolowrat and Krakovec (mentioned 1479–1530), The highest judge of feudal court in Bohemia
- Albrecht II. Lord of Kolowrat (mentioned 1503–1542), Governor of Rakovník region
- Jan Lord Kolowrat-Krakowsky (mentioned 1530–1555), Governor of Rakovník region
- Kryštof Jindřich Lord Krakowsky of Kolowrat (1549–1596), Governor of Rakovník region
- Bohuslav Jiří Lord Krakowsky of Kolowrat (1596–1638/41), Chamberlain and Imperial Council
- Vilém Albrecht I. Count Krakowsky of Kolowrat (1600–1688), Chief Feudal judge and chief bailiff of the Kingdom of Bohemia, Sponsor
- Kryštof Jaroslav Lord Krakowsky of Kolowrat (mentioned 1604–1659), Imperial Council, Associate of feudal chambre court, Sponsor
- Jan František Count Krakowsky of Kolowrat (1649–1723), The Highest Chancellor of the Kingdom of Bohemia, Royal Commissioner
- Albrecht Jindřich Count Krakowsky of Kolowrat (1655–1704), Governor of the Rakovník region
- Maximilian Norbert Count Krakowsky of Kolowrat (1660–1721), Supreme Provincial Chamberlain, President of the Appellate Council in Bohemia, Sponsor
- Vilém Albrecht II. Count Krakowsky of Kolowrat, Baron of Újezd (1678–1738), The Highest Chancellor of the Bohemian Royal Court
- Filip Nerius (Neri) Count Krakowsky of Kolowrat (1686–1773), Knight of the Golden Fleece, Grand Burgrave, Supreme Judge
- Kajetán František Count Krakowsky of Kolowrat (1689–1769), Field marshal and military commander in Moravia
- Emanuel Václav Kajetán Count Krakowsky of Kolowrat (1700–1769), Cavalry General, the owner of the Kolowrat dragoon regiment, Grand Prior of the Order of Malta
- Prokop Jan Count Krakowsky of Kolowrat, Baron of Újezd (1718–1774), Supreme feudal judge, Supreme Judge in Bohemia
- Leopold Vilém Count Krakowsky of Kolowrat (1727–1809), Knight of the Order of the Golden Fleece, The supreme Czech-Austrian Chancellor, First Minister of State and Conference Minister, Founder of the Order of Saint Joachim
- Jan Nepomuk Karel Josef Count Krakowsky of Kolowrat, Baron of Újezd (1748–1816), Commander of the Order of the Knights of Malta, Commanding general in Bohemia, Lieutenant Field Marshal
- Alois Josef Count Krakowsky of Kolowrat, Baron of Újezd (1759–1833), Archbishop of Prague
- František Xaver I. Count Krakowsky of Kolowrat (1783–1855), Chamberlain, Lieutenant-Colonel (Oberstleutnant)
- Jan Nepomuk Karel (called Hanuš) Count Krakowský-Nowohradský of Kolowrat, Baron of Újezd (1794–1872), Honorable Knight of the Order of the Knights of Malta, Chamberlain, Imperial Privy Council, Sponsor
- František Xaver II. Count Krakowsky of Kolowrat (1803–1873), Czech grand prior of the Maltese knights order, The ambassador at the Hapsburg imperial court in Vienna
- Leopold Maria Meinrad Adam Camillo Johann Nepomuk Raimund Count Krakowsky of Kolowrat (1804–1863), Field Marshal, the right hand of Marshal Joseph Radetzky von Radetz
- Leopold Filip Count Krakowsky of Kolowrat (1852–1910), member of the Imperial Council and the Czech Assembly, Second Class knight of the Order of the Iron Crown
- Alexandr Joseph Count Krakowsky of Kolowrat (1886–1927), film producer, car and motorcycle racing driver
- Bertha née Countess Kolowrat-Krakowský, Countess of Colloredo-Mannsfeld (1890–1982), grandmother and guardian of Igor and Grichka Bogdanoff
- Jindřich Josef Vilém Albrecht Pavel Count Kolowrat-Krakowský (1897–1996), politician, and restorer of the family estate
- František Sal. Tomáš Karel Count Kolowrat-Krakowský (1943–2004), family property administration
