= Carol Remond =

Carol S. Remond is a journalist for Dow Jones Newswires, a subsidiary of Dow Jones & Company, publisher of The Wall Street Journal.

== Career ==
In 2005, she won the Gerald Loeb Award in the News Services Online Content category for her coverage of "Exposing Small-Cap Fraud." Her reporting on the small-cap stocks helped expose three companies that used unscrupulous means to promote their stocks. The work led to SEC investigations of these companies.

Remond has a bachelor's degree in economics from the University of Dijon (France) and a master's degree in political science from Miami University at Oxford, Ohio.
