= Kolowrat Palace =

Coordinates: 50.0861°N 14.4242°E

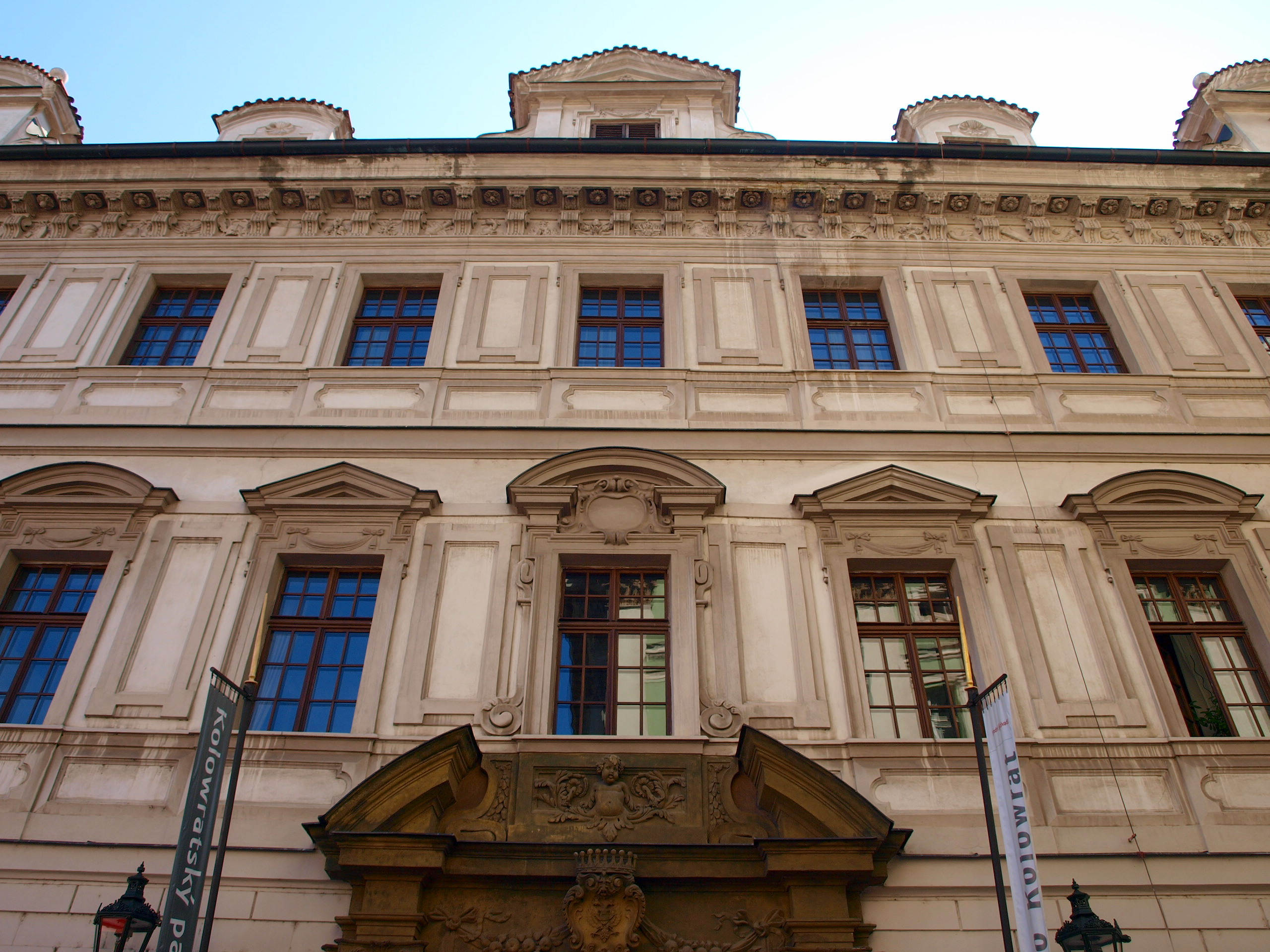
The Kolowrat Palace in 2012

The Kolowrat Palace (Czech: Kolowratský palác) is a Baroque complex of two Gothic buildings, located at Ovocný trh 4 a 6 in the Old Town part of the Prague 1 district in Prague, Czech Republic.

The palace belongs to the Kolowrat family. The family bought the first building in 1670 and the second one in 1697. The original vaults from the early Baroque period are located on the ground floor, and the rooms on the first floor are decorated with Baroque painted-wood ceilings.

Around 1948, the palace was nationalized by the government, but after the Velvet Revolution in 1989, the property was returned to the family. In 1993, Count Jindrich Kolowrat-Krakowsky (1897–1996) rented out the palace to the National Theatre for a symbolic annual amount of one Czech koruna. The attic of the palace now houses the Kolowrat Theatre, one of the venues of the National Theatre.
