= Megatrend University =

Private university in Serbia (1989–2024)

- Универзитет Мегатренд; Univerzitet Megatrend
- Former name: University John Naisbitt (2015–17)
- Type: Private
- Established: 1989; 37 years ago
- Rector: Mića Jovanović
- Academic staff: 208 (2022–23)
- Students: 396 (2022–23)
- Undergraduates: 387 (2022–23)
- Postgraduates: 9 (2022–23)
- Doctoral students: 0 (2022–23)
- Location: Belgrade, Serbia; 44°49′52.6″N 20°24′56.3″E
- Campus: Urban
- Website: www.megatrend.edu.rs

Megatrend University (Serbian: Универзитет Мегатренд, romanized: Univerzitet Megatrend) is a private university located in New Belgrade, the city of Belgrade, Serbia. It was founded in 1989 as the Megatrend Business School, which later became Megatrend University.

In 2015, the Council of Megatrend University changed the name of the institution to University John Naisbitt, which was changed back two years later. In September 2024, Megatrend University lost its license to operate in Serbia.

The university has a negative reputation in Serbia for a series of controversies, including claims that it is a diploma mill, that it falsely advertised an international university network that does not exist, that its list of lecturers is false, and that it exaggerates its enrollment and other statistics.

== History ==
=== 1989–2015 ===
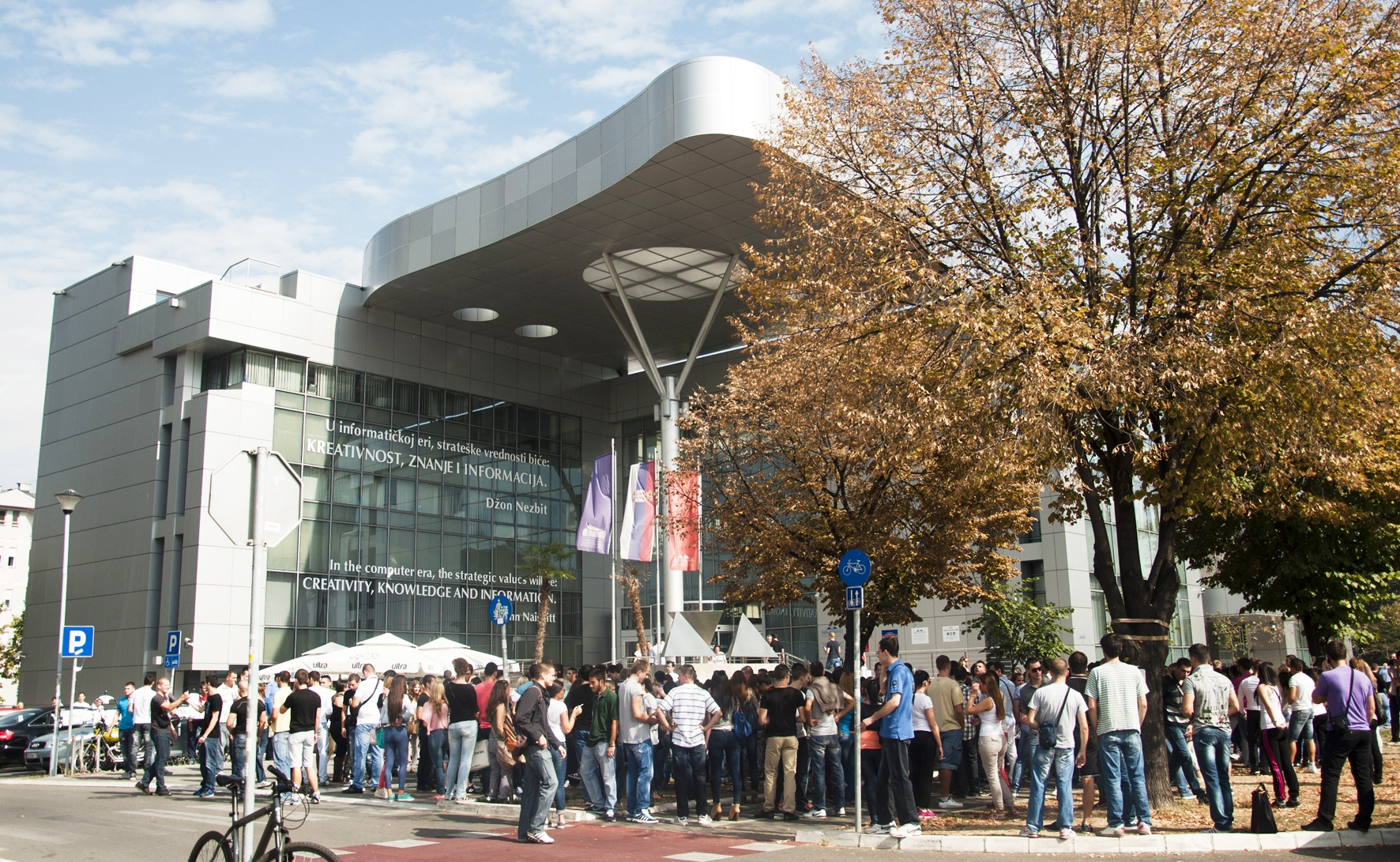
Former Headquarters building of the University

Megatrend Business School was established in Belgrade in 1989. It was the predecessor of the institutions which comprise the present Megatrend University.

In 1991, Megatrend Business School, together with the Technical Faculty of Bor, introduced a management graduate studies introduction course. This project was financially supported by the European Union TEMPUS Fund for developing business education.

In June 2000, the Serbian Ministry of Higher Education approved the formation of the Megatrend University of Applied Sciences in Belgrade.

In 2008, Megatrend claimed to have 26,000 enrolled students, which would have made it by far the most popular private university in Serbia.

In 2011, Megatrend purchased the operations of the failed International University Vienna, creating Megatrend International University Vienna, however this did not achieve accreditation before its insolvency in 2013. At the time, Megatrend was listed as a member of the Euro-Asia Management Studies Association (EAMSA), which runs annual conferences in Europe and Asia to discuss economic and management issues as well as promoting research and publishing.

=== 2015–2024 ===
In 2015, after escalating controversies surrounding Megatrend University, the Megatrend Council changed the name of the institution to University John Naisbitt, allegedly to honor the American author John Naisbitt. The name was changed back to Megatrend University in 2017.

As of 2019, Megatrend reported 3,526 enrolled students. In November 2019, Megatrend's founder and owner Mića Jovanović stated that Megatrend was sold for 56.1 million euros to Dejan Đorđević, who leads an undisclosed German fund consortium which Jovanović said he was not sure actually existed. As of 2022–23 academic year, Megatrend had a total of 439 enrolled students, making it a university with the least number of enrolled students in Serbia. In September 2024, the Ministry of Education of Serbia revoked license to operate to the Megatrend University.

== Organization ==
As of 2022–23 academic year, Megatrend consisted of 8 faculties, a virtual campus, and 4 outposts in other cities:

- Belgrade

- Faculty of Business Studies
- Faculty of International Economics (previously Faculty of Geo-Economy)
- Megatrend Business School
- Faculty of culture and media
- Faculty of Arts and Design
- Faculty of Law
- The Institute for New Technologies
- Megatrend Virtual University
- Faculty of Computer Science

- Bačka Topola

- Megatrend School of Agriculture

- Požarevac

- Faculty for Business Studies

- Valjevo

- Faculty of Management

- Zaječar

- Faculty of Management

== Notable alumni ==
- Vesna de Vinča (b. 1957), Serbian television author, film and event producer
- Zoran Đorđević (b. 1970), Serbian politician, former Ministry of Defence of Serbia, and Ministry of Labour, Employment, Veteran and Social Policy
- Nebojša Stefanović (b. 1976), Serbian politician, former President of the National Assembly of Serbia, and Deputy Prime Minister, Minister of Internal Affairs of Serbia
- Vojin Mijatović (b. 1979), Bosnian politician
- Nataša Bekvalac (b. 1980), Serbian popular singer
- Irena Vujović (b. 1983), Serbian politician, President of the Stari Grad Municipality
- Marija Šerifović (b. 1984), Serbian popular singer, winner of the 2007 Eurovision Song Contest
- Jelena Janković (b. 1985), Serbian tennis player
- Miloš Teodosić (b. 1987), Serbian basketball player

== Controversies ==
The university is said to have a relatively low reputation in the eyes of the Serbian public due to its allegedly dubious programs and low standards, as well as due to its perceived mutually beneficial connections with politicians and government officials who have been awarded Megatrend diplomas. Those connections supposedly ensured its accreditation, which helped the university to somewhat silence its critics who have been accusing it of being a diploma mill. According to Megatrend's representatives, such criticism can not apply to a "University where the prime minister of Serbia had given four lectures in one year, and two ministers of education are employed at it." In an opinion piece in Al Jazeera about problems in Serbian higher education, Zorana Suvakovic described Megatrend as "essentially a degree mill where diplomas can be obtained for cash."

Megatrend University awarded an honorary doctorate to Muammar Gaddafi, the former leader of Libya, in 2007. When asked to comment on this subject, the deputy minister of education, prof. Srbijanka Turajlić said that "this is not a deed of which any University should be proud, but taking into account the quality of the university, it is not surprising that the doctorate was awarded to the dictator."

In 2010, the magazine Marianne, commenting on the Bogdanov affair, showed that the Bogdanoff brothers were employed at the Megatrend University as professors in the department of cosmology, and that they used this to increase their credibility with the French public. The magazine commented that this was a mutually beneficial deal between rector Jovanović and the Bogdanoffs: The brothers gained the titles of professors and Megatrend gained two foreign professors on the staff. Alain Riazuelo, an astrophysicist at the Institut d'Astrophysique de Paris, showed that Megatrend does not have a department of Cosmology, as the main focus of the university is on economics and management studies. There is no trace of the Bogdanoffs' courses or lecture notes. Rector Jovanovic (owner of Megatrend) published their pseudoscientific book and wrote the foreword for it, which gave him a kind of prestige in the eyes of the general public in Serbia.

On June 1, 2014, a group of Serbian academics based in the UK published an article claiming that parts of the Minister of Internal Affairs of Serbia Nebojša Stefanović's doctoral dissertation were plagiarized. The controversy escalated further when other academics raised serious doubts as to whether Megatrend's rector and Stefanović's mentor Mića Jovanović was ever awarded a doctorate at all. The original story in the Serbian media reported a statement by him that he had obtained his doctorate studying under the "famous professor Stephen Wood of the London School of Economics." Wood confirmed that a dissertation had been submitted but that it had been rejected.

On June 12, 2014, the Serbian Ministry of Education confirmed that Megatrend's rector had forged his Ph.D. at LSE. In the wake of these findings the ministry called on rector Jovanović to resign. It also called on relevant authorities to determine whether there were elements of criminal offense. Jovanovic resigned the following day. In 2015, he was reported to have left Serbia. Jovanović later returned to Megatrend, and was re-elected its rector in 2019, shortly before it was sold to Đorđević.

== See also ==
- Education in Serbia
- List of universities in Serbia
