= Pile of Saint-Lary =

- Pile de Saint-Lary
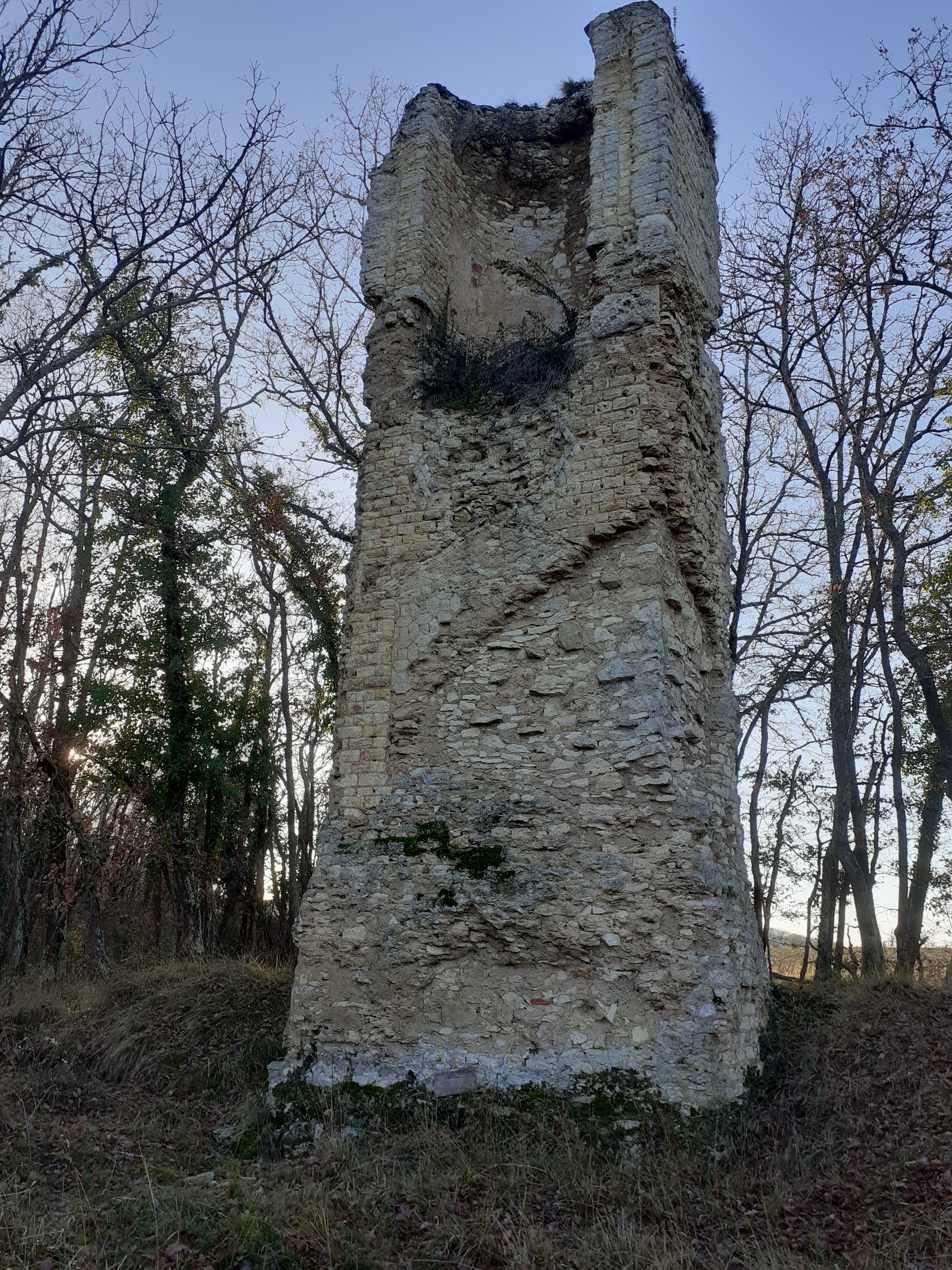
- Pile of Saint-Lary
- Interactive map of Pile of Saint-Lary
- 43°43′12″N 0°29′25″E
- Type: Funerary monument
- Location: Saint-Lary, Gers, Occitanie, France
- Region: Occitanie

History
- Built: Gallo-Roman period

Site notes
- Height: 10.25 m (33.6 ft)
- Owner: Municipality of Saint-Lary

Monument historique
- Designated: 1875
- Reference no.: PA00094917

The Pile of Saint-Lary is a Gallo-Roman stone tower, also known as a pile, located in Saint-Lary, in the Gers department of France. It has been listed as a Monument historique since 1875.

== Location ==
Map showing the locations of the piles in Ordan-Larroque and Saint-Lary

The pile is situated on the top of a hill, within a wooded area, approximately 700 meters from the village of Saint-Lary, separated by the D 930 road.

== Description ==
The Pile of Saint-Lary is one of the most remarkable piles in the Gers region, notable for retaining much of its original facing, along with decorative elements. It is a quadrangular structure standing at 10.25 meters tall and measuring 3.90 meters on each side. The upper part features an eastern-facing niche, now missing its vault, but originally semi-circular in plan and likely vaulted in a semi-dome. This niche is framed by two pilasters beneath a prominent cornice.

Below the niche, the carefully constructed small stone blocks present decorative elements, including two vertical diamond shapes formed by smaller stone diamonds, above a triangular pediment filled with small horizontal diamonds. Below this, a rectangular mosaic panel comprises hexagonal and square tiles in contrasting colors. The north and southwest faces are composed of dry stone.

The pile of Saint-Lary is classified as a Monument historique (France) and has been listed since 1875.
