= Albert Schatz (law) =

Albert Schatz (1879–1940) was a law professor at the University of Dijon and historian of 19th century individualism and Jean-Baptiste Say.

His 1907 work L'individualisme économique et social (Individualism - Economic and Social) first outlines a basis for the classical liberal doctrine, in France to be traced back to the Physiocrats. Then he talks about the diverse aspect of individualism in the 19th century: from Charles Dunoyer to Mill, and to Bastiat. He also talks about individualism in relation to politics (liberal democracy), its relationship to religion, and finally to Spencer's sociology, and anarchism.
