= Bernard Schmitt (economist) =

French economist (1929–2014)

Bernard Schmitt (1929 in Colmar, France – 2014 in Beaune, France) was a French economist, founder of the school of economic thought known as 'quantum macroeconomics'.

During his doctoral research (Paris, 1958) he studied at the University of Cambridge (UK), under the supervision of Piero Sraffa and Dennis Robertson. In 1954, he became a member of the Centre National de la Recherche Scientifique (CNRS), in Paris. His works on macroeconomic theory and monetary analysis were awarded two medals by the CNRS, in 1961 and in 1973.

He was professor in monetary macroeconomics at the University of Dijon, France, and at the University of Fribourg, Switzerland.

== Bibliography (partial) ==
1960: La formation du pouvoir d’achat, Paris: Sirey.
1966: Monnaie, salaires et profits, Paris: Presses Universitaires de France.
1971: L’analyse macroéconomique des revenues, Paris: Dalloz.
1972: Macroeconomic Theory. A Fundamental Revision, Albeuve: Castella.
1973: New Proposals for World Monetary Reform, Albeuve: Castella.
1975a: Théorie unitaire de la monnaie, nationale et internationale, Albeuve: Castella.
1975b: Génération de la monnaie des monnaies européennes, Albeuve: Castella.
1976-7: La pensée de Karl Marx. Critique et synthèse, with. Cencini, A., Albeuve: Castella.
1977a: L’or, le dollar et la monnaie supranationale, Paris: Calmann-Lévy.
1977b: La monnaie européenne, Paris: Presses Universitaires de France.
1978: Die Theorie des Kreditgeldes, Stuttgart: Gustav-Fischer.
1982: "Time as Quantum", in Baranzini, M. (ed.): Advances in Economic Theory, Oxford: Blackwell.
1984a: Inflation, chômage et malformations du capital. Macroéconomie quantique, Paris and Albeuve: Economica and Castella.
1984b: La France souveraine de sa monnaie, Paris and Albeuve: Economica and Castella.
1984c: "Introduzione" of Scritti monetari by David Ricardo, Rome: Istituto dell'Enciclopedia Italiana.
1986: "The Process of Formation of Economics in Relation to other Sciences", in Baranzini, M. and Scazzieri, R. (eds.): Foundations of Economics, Oxford: Blackwell.
1988: "The Identity of Aggregate Supply and Demand in Time", in Barrère, A. (ed.): The Foundations of Keynesian Analysis, London and New York: Macmillan Press.
1991: External Debt Servicing. A Vicious Circle, with Cencini, A., London and New York: Pinter.
1996a: "Unemployment: Is There a Principal Cause?", in Cencini, A. and Baranzini, M. (eds.): Inflation and Unemployment, London and New York: Routledge.
1996b: "A New Paradigm for the Determination of Money Prices", in Deleplace, G. and Nell, E.J. (eds.): Money in Motion, London and New York: Macmillan and St. Martin's Press.
1996c: "Monnaie", in Encyclopaedia Universalis, Paris.
2003: "Circuit économique et pensée néoclassique", in Piégay, P. et Rochon, L.-P. (eds.): Théories monétaires post Keynésiennes, Paris: Economica.
