= University of Burgundy Europe =

Public university in Dijon, France

Coordinates: 47°18′45″N 5°4′15″E

- Université Bourgogne Europe
- Former name: University of Dijon (1722-1984)
- Type: Public
- Established: 1722; 304 years ago
- Budget: 242 million €
- Rector: Vincent Thomas
- Administrative staff: 2,838 including 1,537 professors
- Students: 33,348
- Location: Dijon, Bourgogne-Franche-Comté, France
- Website: https://www.ube.fr/

University of Burgundy Europe (French: Université Bourgogne Europe, UBE), formerly known as University of Dijon until the 1980's, then as University of Burgundy until 2024) is a public university located in Dijon, France.

Université Bourgogne Europe is situated on a large campus (more than 150 ha) in the eastern part of Dijon called Campus Montmuzard, about 15 minutes by tram from the city centre. The humanities and sciences are well represented on the main campus, along with law, medicine, engineering, or social sciences, in separate buildings. The IUT (Undergraduate Institute of Technology) is also on the campus, providing specialist higher level diplomas in business, biology, communications and computer science.

The university counts 16 faculties and schools in total (in details: 8 faculties, 2 engineering schools, 1 teacher training institute, 3 undergraduate institutes of technology offering undergraduate courses, and 2 professional institutes providing post-graduate programmes).

Due to the numerous student societies and support services for international students and disabled students, the campus is a welcoming place, with numerous CROUS student restaurants and canteens.

== History ==
The university was founded in 1722 by King Louis XV. Initially there was only the law faculty but from 1805 to 1809 faculties of science, arts, and medicine were added by Napoleon.

In 2024 and 2025, the University of Burgundy was restructured as the University of Burgundy Europe, an Experimental Public Institution, which also newly affiliated the following additional institutions:

Constituent
- École Nationale Supérieure d'Art (ENSA)
- École des Mines de Saint-Étienne (ESM).
Associated
- Burgundy School of Business (BSB)
- ESTP Paris (Dijon Campus)
- ESEO (Angers/Dijon)
- CESI (Dijon)
- ESAAB (Nevers)
- CHU Dijon (Hospital Center)
- CGFL (Cancer Research Center).
Partners
- Science Po Dijon Campus
- CROUS Bourgogne Franche-Comté (Student Services).

== Students ==
In 2025, there are about 33,000 students, spread in six campuses across the region of Burgundy: Dijon, Auxerre, Chalon-sur-Saône, Le Creusot, Mâcon and Nevers. 66% of the students are coming from the region of Burgundy. About 3,000+ are foreign students.

== Points of interest ==
- Serres de l'Université de Bourgogne

== Notable faculty ==
- Gaston Bachelard, French philosopher
- Louis Bachelier, French mathematician
- Pietro Balestra, economist
- Doug Beardsley, poet
- Sophie Béjean, University president
- Gaspard Auguste Brullé, French entomologist
- Roland Carraz, former member of the French Parliament and former Secretary of state
- Lucien Febvre, French historian
- Robert M. French, French Cognitive scientist
- Robert Folz, French historian, medievalist, former Dean
- Henri Hauser, Economist, historian, geographer
- Albert Mathiez, French historian (Professor from 1919 to 1926)
- Jocelyne Pérard, President, University of Burgundy, 1993-98
- Louis Renault (jurist) (lecturer at this university, later Nobel Peace Prize Laureate)
- Jean Richard (historian), historian, member of the Institut de France, President of the Académie des Inscriptions et Belles-Lettres since 2002
- Albert Schatz, jurist, historian
- Bernard Schmitt, economist, founder of the school of economic thought known as quantum economics
- Aurélie Trouvé, President of ATTAC France

== Notable alumni ==
- Mohammed A. Aldouri, former Permanent Representative of Iraq to the United Nations (2001–2003)
- Edvard Beneš, Former President of Czechoslovakia
- Igor and Grichka Bogdanov, French Television presenters, known for the Bogdanov affair
- Guy Canivet jurist, president of the Court of Cassation
- Chérie Carter-Scott, American author
- Antanas Mockus, Colombian mathematician, philosopher, and politician
- Rachida Dati, Member of the European Parliament, Keeper of the Seals, Minister of Justice
- Mahmoud El Materi, Former Minister (Tunisia)
- Jacques Fradin, Medical Doctor, cognitive and behavioural therapist
- Pierre Frogier, Politician, former President of the Government of New Caledonia
- Henri-François Gautrin, Member of National Assembly of Quebec
- Adolé Isabelle Glitho-Akueson, Professor of Animal Biology at the University of Lome
- Léopold Gnininvi, Togolese politician, Secretary-General of the Democratic Convention of African Peoples
- Lawrence Gushee, American musicologist
- Mohammad-Ali Jamalzadeh, prominent Iranian writer
- Joseph Jacotot, philosopher, creator of the method of "intellectual emancipation"
- Alain Joyandet, politician, former Secretary of State for Cooperation and Francophony
- Henri Jayer, French vintner
- Roch Marc Christian Kaboré, President of Burkina Faso (2015–present)
- H. T. Kirby-Smith, American author and poet
- Faik Konitza, Albanian politician, stylist, critic.
- Georges-Louis Leclerc, Comte de Buffon, French naturalist, mathematician, cosmologist
- Kevin S. MacLeod, Usher of the Black Rod for the Canadian Senate
- Souad Kassim Mohamed (born 1976), Djiboutian linguist
- Arnaud Montebourg, Deputy of the fifth district of Saône-et-Loire to the French National Assembly
- Lawrence Clark Powell, literary critic, bibliographer and author
- Carol Remond, award-winning journalist (Dow Jones Newswires), publisher of the Wall Street Journal.
- Aurélie Trouvé (fr), President of ATTAC France
- Pierre Viette, entomologist
- George Kennedy Young, deputy director of MI6
- Chuka Umunna, British politician
- Paul Bosc, chairman and founder of Château Des Charmes, recipient of the Order of Canada
- Julie Le Gallo, French writer

== See also ==
- List of early modern universities in Europe
