= Mohammed A. Aldouri =

Iraqi diplomat

Permanent Representative of Iraq to the United Nations
- In office 21 March 2001 – 11 April 2003

Personal details
- Born: September 12, 1941 (age 84) Baghdad, Kingdom of Iraq
- Party: Iraqi Regional Branch of the Arab Socialist Ba'ath Party

Mohammed A. Aldouri (Arabic: محمد الدوري) (born 12 September 1941) was the Permanent Representative of Iraq to the United Nations from 2001 to 2003.

== Early life ==
Born in Baghdad, he attended Baghdad University and earned a bachelor's degree in law in 1964. In 1973, Aldouri received a Ph.D. in public law from France’s Dijon University. He was dean of the Law College of Baghdad University from 1983 to 1998 while he served as a professor of international law.

== Career ==
Aldouri was a member of the Iraqi delegation to the United Nations from 1980 to 1984. From 1994 to 1996, Aldouri was head of the Legal Department and Human Rights Department of the Iraqi Foreign Ministry. He served as Iraq’s Representative to the United Nations Office at Geneva from 1999 up until his appointment as Iraq's Ambassador to the United Nations in February 2001. Before and during the 2003 invasion of Iraq, Aldouri gained international attention for his harsh criticisms of the US and vigorous defenses of Saddam Hussein’s regime. On April 9, Aldouri became the first high-ranking Iraqi official to admit that Hussein’s government had collapsed. On April 11, Aldouri resigned as Ambassador to the UN and left the United States.

Since resigning, Aldouri has called Saddam Hussein a "tyrant" and apologized for some of the "tough" remarks he had made about the United States while ambassador. However, Aldouri has also become a major critic of the US presence in Iraq and has called for the withdrawal of foreign troops from the country. He currently resides in Dubai, United Arab Emirates.

In a television interview that aired September 22, 2010 on Decision Makers TV, he openly speculated about the possibility that the United States may have been complicit in the events of September 11 attacks in 2001. He asserted, "The tyranny of the U.S., and its goals in ruling the world and taking over the entire world -- from north to south and from east to west -- were, in my opinion, the indirect cause of the events of 9/11, if not the direct cause." He claimed that many people "have doubted the ability of Al-Qaeda to carry out such a momentous, earth-shattering event... Many people claim that the U.S. intelligence -- or at least part of the Pentagon -- was behind 9/11. But only God knows."
