= Nicolaas Marinus Hugenholtz =

Dutch physicist and academic (1924–2026)

Nicolaas Marinus Hugenholtz (26 April 1924 – 18 February 2026) was a Dutch physicist and academic. He was a professor of theoretical physics at the University of Groningen from 1960 to 1989.

== Life and career ==
Hugenholtz was born in Wormerveer on 26 April 1924. He studied physics at Leiden University and obtained his degree in 1948. Hugenholtz subsequently studied theoretical physics under Hans Kramers. He obtained his PhD in physics at Utrecht University in 1957 with a thesis titled: The quantum theory of large systems and its application to the structure of nuclear matter.

He was elected a member of the Royal Netherlands Academy of Arts and Sciences in 1988.

Hugenholtz died on 18 February 2026, at the age of 101.

== See also ==
- Gross–Pitaevskii equation
- KMS state
