= Serres de l'Université de Bourgogne =

Greenhouse botanical gardens in Côte-d'Or, France

Coordinates: 47.3139°N 5.0713°E

The Serres de l'Université de Bourgogne are greenhouse botanical gardens operated by the University of Burgundy. They are located at 8 rue du Recteur Marcel Bouchard, Dijon, Bourgogne, Côte-d'Or, France.

The greenhouses were established in 1966 and consist of a palm house, laboratories, and six greenhouses designated for hot, temperate, and cold climates, cactuses, experiments, and multiple purposes. They preserve various threatened plants of Bourgogne, and also contain a range of tropical and subtropical genera such as Psilotum and Lycopodium, tropical aquatics such as Eichhornia and Salvinia, carnivorous plants including Sarracenia and Darlingtonia, and epiphytes including Bromeliaceae and Orchidaceae. Collections also include a herbarium (5,000 specimens of historic interest) and teaching models of plants.

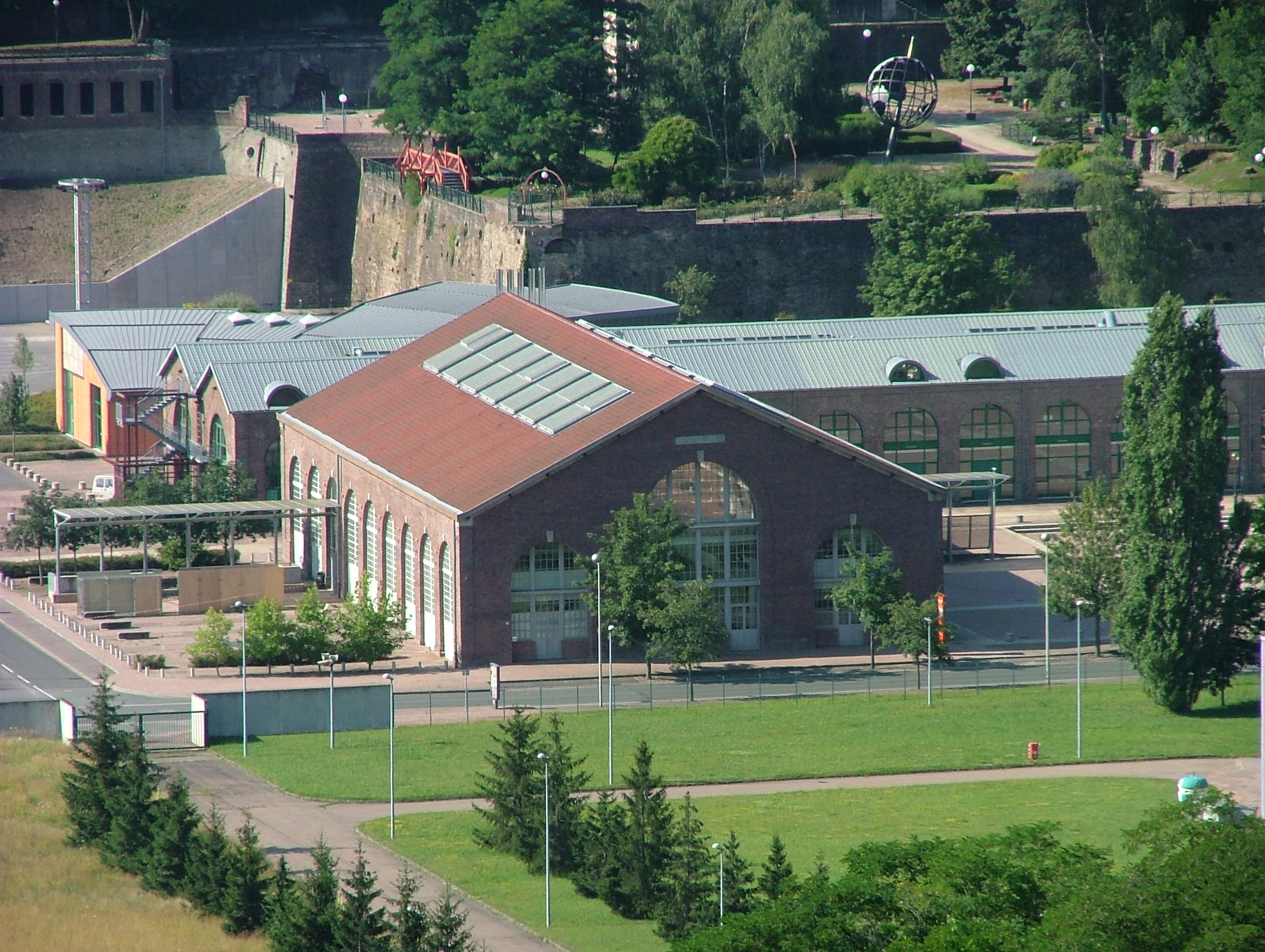
Serres de l'Université de Bourgogne

== See also ==
- List of botanical gardens in France
