= Sophie Béjean =

French university president

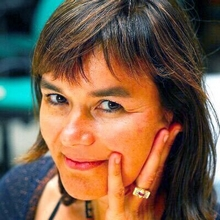
- Béjean in 2012
- Born: 22 June 1964 (age 61); Grenoble, France
- Occupation: Economist
- Known for: President of University of Burgundy

Sophie Béjean (born 22 June 1964 in Grenoble) is a French university president. She served as president of the University of Burgundy (2007–12), before becoming president of fr:Centre national des œuvres universitaires et scolaires (CNOUS) and fr:Campus France (April 2013).

From 1982 to 1989, Béjean studied economics at the University of Dijon, and received a Master of Advanced Studies in analysis and economic policies. This was followed by a PhD in economics and social sciences in 1992 in the healthcare economy. In 1993, she became a lecturer in economics, and was promoted to university professor in 2003. From 1999 to 2007, she directed the master's degree programs in "Management and Evaluation of Healthcare Organizations" at the University of Dijon. She led the University of Burgundy from May 2007 to May 2012, as well as serving as President of the Foundation for Scientific Cooperation PRES Bourgogne Franche-Comté from 2010 to 2012. During the period of December 2010 to June 2012, she was also the president of the committee on resources and personnel of the Conférence des Présidents d'Université. Since 2003, she has been the head of the team of health economics in the economics and management laboratory's Joint Research Unit, CNRS/University of Burgundy.

In April 2013, she was named president of two public institutions, CNOUS and Campus France. In 2020, Béjean became Rector of the Académie de Montpellier, an administrative region in France.

== Distinctions ==
- Commandeur, Order of Merit (2019)
- Chevalier, Legion of Honour (2012)

== Bibliography ==
- Économie du système de santé : du marché à l'organisation, collection "Approfondissement de la connaissance économique", avant-propos de Jean-Jacques Laffont, préface de Maryse Gadreau, Economica, 1994 (in French)
- Santé, Règles et Rationalités (avec Christine Peyron, préface de Gilles Johanet), Economica, 2002 (in French)
- Microéconomie (avec Christine Peyron), collection "Hypercours' Dalloz, 2003 (in French)
