= Robert Folz =

Robert Folz FBA (12 March 1910 – 5 March 1996) was a French medievalist and specialist on the Carolingian era.

Born in Metz, Folz spent his academic career at the University of Burgundy in Dijon. Professor of history from 1947, he headed the history department as dean and professor emeritus from 1968, and the faculty of arts from 1978. From 1956 he was a member of the Academy of Science, Arts, and Belles-lettres of Dijon.

His papers are held, as the Fonds Robert Folz, by the University of Burgundy.

== Biography ==
Robert Folz was born in Metz during the first Alsace–Lorraine, on March 12, 1910. He attended secondary school in Metz, then the Faculty of Nancy and finally the University of Strasbourg. Agrégé d'histoire in 1933, he went to Berlin to write a doctoral thesis under the supervision of Marc Bloch. The war interrupted his research. After the Allied troops landed in North Africa, he enlisted as an interpreter and took part in the liberation of Italy and France. For his services, he was awarded the American Medal of Freedom (1945).

After defending his thesis on Charlemagne in 1949, he became professor of medieval history at the University of Burgundy Europe, a position he held from 1950 to 1986. From 1968 to 1978, he was head of the History Department[4]. His research focused mainly on the history of medieval Germany. A true mediator between France and Germany, Robert Folz was instrumental in introducing the French public to the German scholarly tradition and its historians, including Ernst Kantorowicz.

A member of the Academy of Mainz, and correspondent of the Institut de France and the British Academy, he was awarded an honorary doctorate by the University of Mainz. Robert Folz died on March 5, 1996.

He is the father of businessman Jean-Martin Folz.

== Select bibliography ==
- (in French) Le souvenir et la légende de Charlemagne dans l'Empire germanique médiéval. (1950)
- The concept of empire in Western Europe from the fifth to the fourteenth century. (1953, translation published 1969)
- The coronation of Charlemagne. 25 December 800. (1964, translation published 1974)
- (in French) Les saints rois du Moyen Âge en Occident, (VIe-XIIIe siècles). (1984)
- (in French) Les saintes reines du Moyen Âge en Occident (VIe-XIIIe siècles). (1992)

== Sources ==
- (in French) Pierre Riché, Dictionnaire des Francs: Les Carolingiens, s.v. "Folz (Robert)". Bartillat, 1997. ISBN 2-84100-125-3
