= Jean-Martin Folz =

French businessman

- Born: 11 January 1947 (age 79); Strasbourg, France
- Education: École Polytechnique, Mines ParisTech
- Occupation: Businessman

Jean-Martin Folz (born 11 January 1947) is a French businessman. He was the chairman and CEO of PSA Peugeot Citroën from 1997 to 2007.

== Biography ==
Jean-Martin Folz is the son of medieval historian Robert Folz. After graduating from the Lycée privé Sainte-Geneviève, he entered the École polytechnique in 1966 and went on to become a Corps des mines engineer.

Reputed to be as bon vivant in private as he was austere or even negligent in public, far removed from the mundane, he scarcely revealed his private life, confessing only to a few passions: wine, scuba diving and Baroque music.
