= Krakovec =

- Municipality
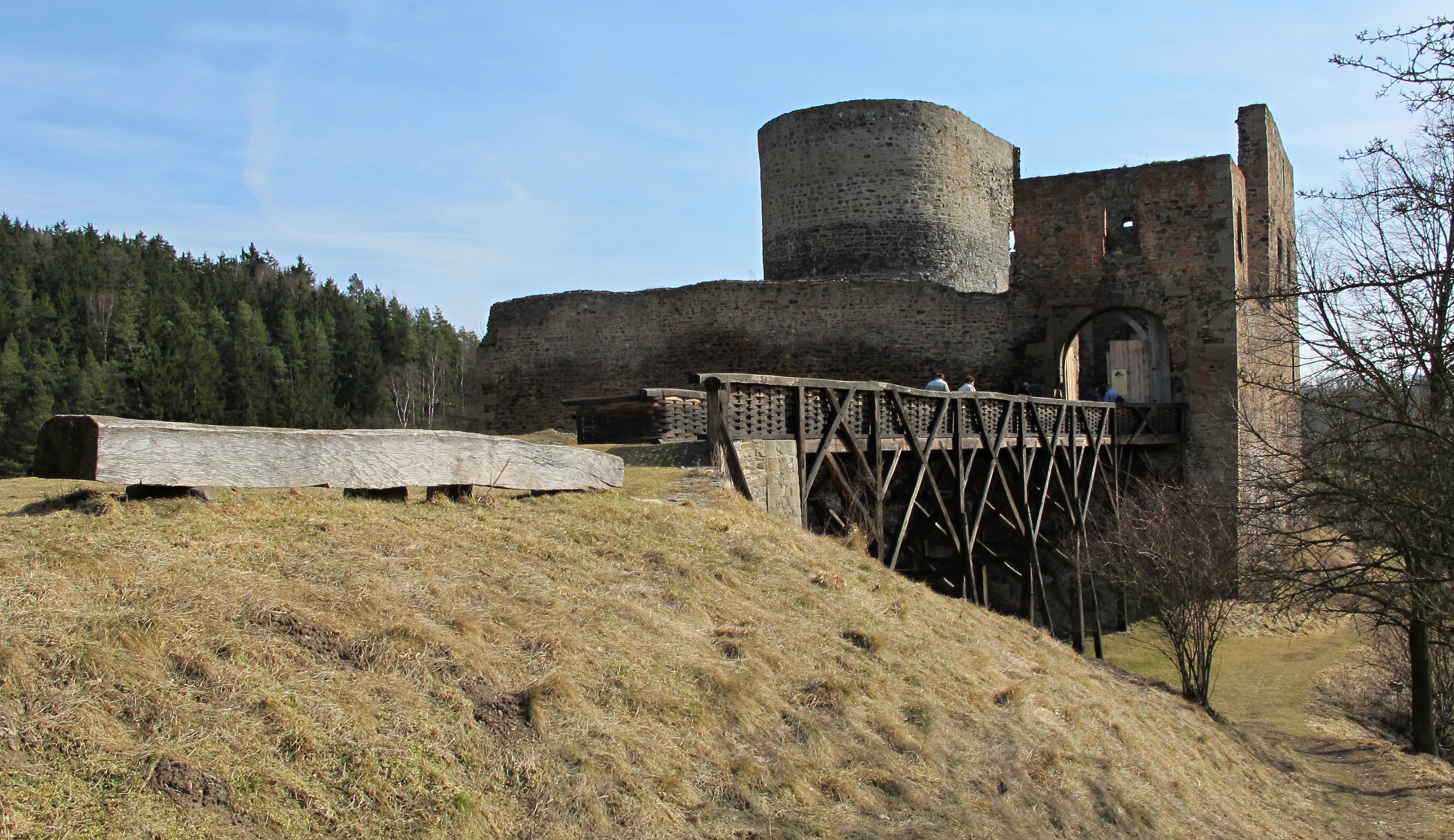
- Krakovec Castle

- Flag Coat of arms

- Location in the Czech Republic
- Coordinates: 50°1′8″N 13°38′18″E
- Country: Czech Republic
- Region: Central Bohemian
- District: Rakovník
- First mentioned: 1370

Area
  - Total: 8.03 km^{2} (3.10 sq mi)
- Elevation: 395 m (1,296 ft)

Population (2026-01-01)
  - Total: 70
  - Density: 8.7/km^{2} (23/sq mi)
- Time zone: UTC+1 (CET)
  - Summer (DST): UTC+2 (CEST)
- Postal code: 270 35
- Website: www.krakovec.cz

Krakovec is a municipality and village in Rakovník District in the Central Bohemian Region of the Czech Republic. It has about 70 inhabitants.

== Administrative division ==
Krakovec consists of two municipal parts (in brackets population according to the 2021 census):

- Krakovec (48)
- Zhoř (24)

== Etymology ==
The name Krakovec is a diminutive of Krakov and has its origin in the personal name Krak.

== Geography ==
Krakovec is located about 11 kilometres (7 mi) southwest of Rakovník and 49 km (30 mi) west of Prague. It lies in the Plasy Uplands. The highest points are the hills Soudný vrch and Ovčín, both at 474 m (1,555 ft) above sea level. The stream Šípský potok flows through the municipality. The southern part of the municipality lies within the Křivoklátsko Protected Landscape Area.

== History ==
The first written mention of Krakovec is from 1370. The village of Zhoř was first mentioned in 1383. History of the villages is connected with the Krakovec Castle, which was built in 1381–1383 for Jíra of Roztoky, who was an important courtier of King Wenceslaus IV. Among the most notable owners of Krakovec were the Kolowrat family, which owned it from 1445 to 1548, and the Lobkowicz family, which bought it in 1548. During the Thirty Years' War, the castle was twice burned down. It was repaired in 1660, but after a lightning strike in 1783 and a subsequent fire, the castle fell into disrepair and was never repaired again.

== Demographics ==
Historical population

Year	Pop.	±%
1869	356	—
1880	335	−5.9%
1890	365	+9.0%
1900	376	+3.0%
1910	337	−10.4%

Year	Pop.	±%
1921	322	−4.5%
1930	254	−21.1%
1950	169	−33.5%
1961	182	+7.7%
1970	161	−11.5%

Year	Pop.	±%
1980	122	−24.2%
1991	90	−26.2%
2001	74	−17.8%
2011	81	+9.5%
2021	72	−11.1%

Source: Censuses

== Transport ==
There are no railways or major roads passing through the municipality.

== Sights ==
Krakovec is known for the ruins of the Krakovec Castle, where the Czech reformer Jan Hus allegedly stayed before departing for Konstanz in 1414. Today this late Gothic castle is owned by the state and is open to the public.
