= Jacobus Verbaarschot =

American physicist

- Education: Utrecht University
- Occupation: Physicist

Jacobus Verbaarschot is an American physicist. He is a distinguished professor in the department of physics and astronomy at Stony Brook University.

In 2011, Verbaarschot was named a fellow of the American Physical Society, "for the development of random-matrix theory methods and their applications in atomic nuclei and in nonperturbative quantum chromodynamics".
