= Steve Carlip =

American professor of physics (born 1953)

- Born: Steven Jonathan Carlip; 1953 (age 72–73)
- Education: Harvard University (BA); University of Texas at Austin (PhD)
- Occupations: Physicist; professor

Steven Jonathan Carlip (born 1953) is an American professor of physics at the University of California, Davis. He is known for his work on (2+1)-dimensional quantum gravity, the quantum gravitational basis of black hole thermodynamics, and causal dynamical triangulations. Carlip graduated from Harvard University with a Bachelor of Arts in physics in 1975. In 1987, he graduated from the University of Texas at Austin, with a Doctor of Philosophy under the direction of Bryce DeWitt. After a post-doctoral period at Institute for Advanced Study in Princeton, New Jersey, he has been teaching—since 1990—at the University of California, Davis. In 2026 he retired from teaching but still is involved in research on campus.

Carlip was one of the recipients of the Department of Energy Outstanding Junior Investigator Award in the year 1991.

== Works ==
- Carlip, Steven, Quantum Gravity in 2+1 Dimensions, ISBN 0-521-54588-9. Cambridge, UK: Cambridge University Press, December 2003.
- Carlip, Steven, General Relativity: A Concise Introduction, ISBN 9780198822158. Oxford, UK: Oxford University Press, March 2019.
