= KMS state =

Type of state in thermal systems

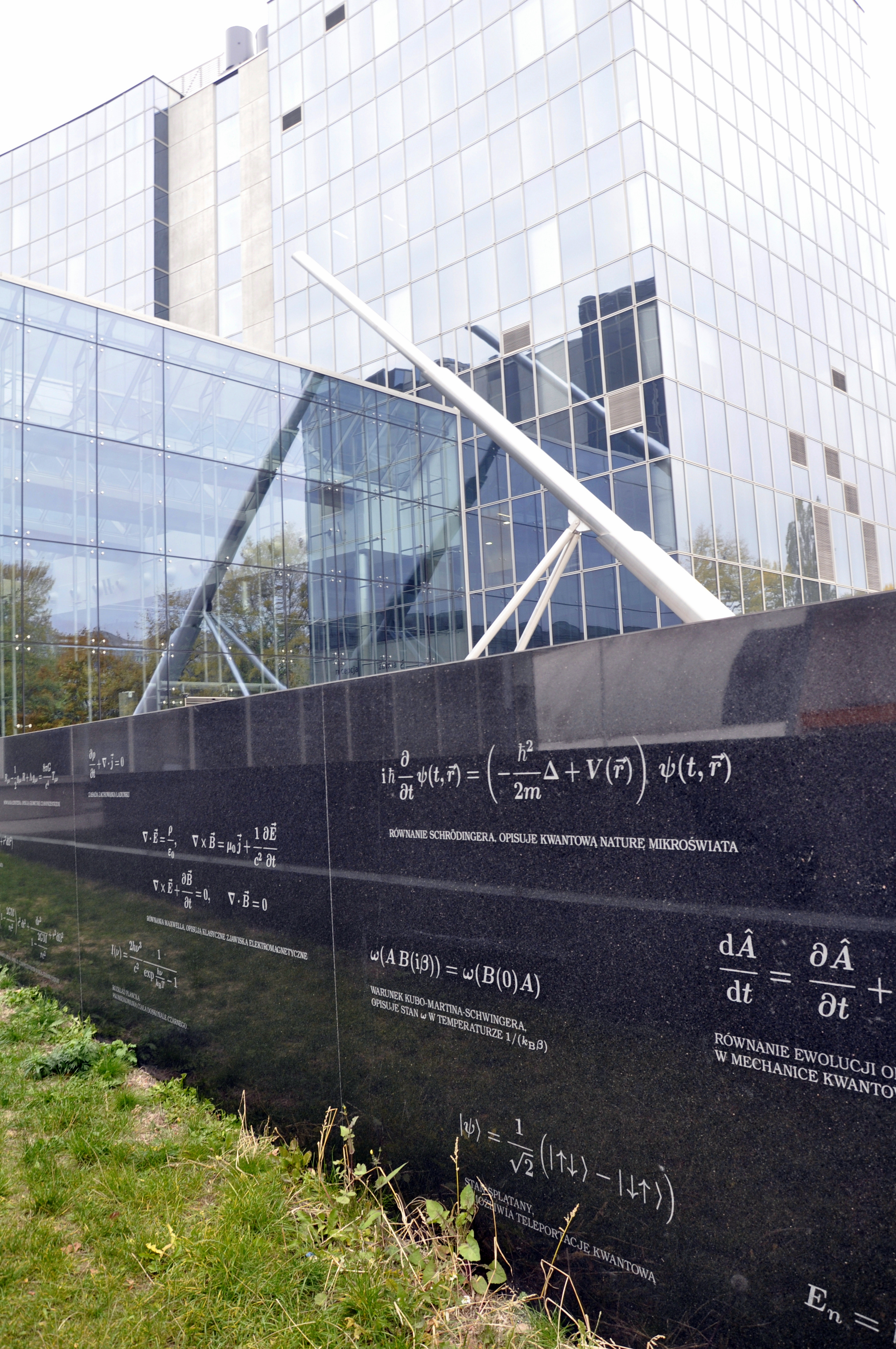
Kubo–Martin–Schwinger condition as featured on a monument in front of Warsaw University's Centre of New Technologies

In the statistical mechanics of quantum mechanical systems and quantum field theory, the properties of a system in thermal equilibrium can be described by a mathematical object called a Kubo–Martin–Schwinger (KMS) state: a state satisfying the KMS condition.

Ryogo Kubo introduced the condition in 1957, Paul C. Martin and Julian Schwinger used it in 1959 to define thermodynamic Green's functions, and Rudolf Haag, Marinus Winnink and Nico Hugenholtz used the condition in 1967 to define equilibrium states and called it the KMS condition.

== Overview ==
The simplest case to study is that of a finite-dimensional Hilbert space, in which one does not encounter complications like phase transitions or spontaneous symmetry breaking. The density matrix of a thermal state is given by

$$\rho_{\beta,\mu}=\frac{\mathrm{e}^{-\beta \left(H - \mu N\right)}}{\mathrm{Tr}\left[ \mathrm{e}^{-\beta \left(H - \mu N\right)} \right]}=\frac{\mathrm{e}^{-\beta \left(H - \mu N\right)}}{Z(\beta,\mu)}$$

where H is the Hamiltonian operator and N is the particle number operator (or charge operator, if we wish to be more general) and

$$Z(\beta,\mu)\ \stackrel{\mathrm{def}}{=}\  \mathrm{Tr}\left[ \mathrm{e}^{-\beta \left(H-\mu N\right)} \right]$$

is the partition function. We assume that N commutes with H, or in other words, that particle number is conserved.

In the Heisenberg picture, the density matrix does not change with time, but the operators are time-dependent. In particular, translating an operator A by τ into the future gives the operator

$$\alpha_\tau(A)\ \stackrel{\mathrm{def}}{=}\  \mathrm{e}^{iH\tau}A \mathrm{e}^{-iH\tau}$$.

A combination of time translation with an internal symmetry "rotation" gives the more general

$$\alpha^{\mu}_{\tau}(A)\ \stackrel{\mathrm{def}}{=}\  \mathrm{e}^{i\left(H-\mu N\right)\tau} A \mathrm{e}^{-i\left(H - \mu N\right)\tau}$$

A bit of algebraic manipulation shows that the expected values

$$\left\langle\alpha^\mu_\tau(A)B\right\rangle_{\beta,\mu} = \mathrm{Tr}\left[\rho \alpha^\mu_\tau(A)B\right] = \mathrm{Tr}\left[\rho B \alpha^\mu_{\tau+i\beta}(A)\right] = \left\langle B\alpha^\mu_{\tau+i\beta}(A)\right\rangle_{\beta,\mu}$$

for any two operators A and B and any real τ (we are working with finite-dimensional Hilbert spaces after all). We used the fact that the density matrix commutes with any function of (H − μN) and that the trace is cyclic.

As hinted at earlier, with infinite dimensional Hilbert spaces, we run into a lot of problems like phase transitions, spontaneous symmetry breaking, operators that are not trace class, divergent partition functions, etc..

The complex functions of z, $\left\langle\alpha^\mu_z(A)B\right\rangle$ converges in the complex strip $-\beta < \Im{z} < 0$ whereas $\left\langle B\alpha^\mu_z(A)\right\rangle$ converges in the complex strip $0 < \Im{z} < \beta$ if we make certain technical assumptions like the spectrum of H − μN is bounded from below and its density does not increase exponentially (see Hagedorn temperature). If the functions converge, then they have to be analytic within the strip they are defined over as their derivatives,

$$\frac{\mathrm{d}}{\mathrm{d}z}\left\langle\alpha^\mu_z(A)B\right\rangle = i\left\langle\alpha^\mu_z\left(\left[H - \mu N, A\right]\right)B\right\rangle$$

and

$$\frac{\mathrm{d}}{\mathrm{d}z}\left\langle B\alpha^\mu_z(A)\right\rangle = i\left\langle B\alpha^\mu_z\left(\left[H - \mu N, A\right]\right)\right\rangle$$

exist.

However, we can still define a KMS state as any state satisfying

$$\left\langle \alpha^\mu_\tau(A)B\right\rangle = \left\langle B\alpha^\mu_{\tau+i\beta}(A)\right\rangle$$

with $\left\langle\alpha^\mu_z(A)B\right\rangle$ and $\left\langle B\alpha^\mu_z(A)\right\rangle$ being analytic functions of z within their domain strips.

$\left\langle\alpha^\mu_\tau(A)B\right\rangle$ and $\left\langle B\alpha^\mu_{\tau+i\beta}(A)\right\rangle$ are the boundary distribution values of the analytic functions in question.

This gives the right large volume, large particle number thermodynamic limit. If there is a phase transition or spontaneous symmetry breaking, the KMS state is not unique.

The density matrix of a KMS state is related to unitary transformations involving time translations (or time translations and an internal symmetry transformation for nonzero chemical potentials) via the Tomita–Takesaki theory.

== See also ==
- Gibbs state
