= Chinese Journal of Physics =

- Discipline: Physics
- Language: English
- Edited by: Hsuan-Yi Chen

Publication details
- History: 1963–present
- Publisher: Elsevier on behalf of the Physical Society of Taiwan
- Frequency: Bimonthly
- Impact factor: 5.3 (2025)

Standard abbreviations
- ISO 4: Chin. J. Phys.
- MathSciNet: Chinese J. Phys.

Indexing
- ISSN: 0577-9073
- OCLC no.: 816149614

Links
- Journal homepage; Online archive

The Chinese Journal of Physics is a bimonthly peer-reviewed scientific journal covering all aspects of physics. It is published by Elsevier on behalf of the Physical Society of Taiwan. The journal publishes reviews, articles, and refereed conference papers in all the major areas of physics. The editor-in-chief is Hsuan-Yi Chen.
