= Mića Jovanović =

Serbian businessman and academic (born 1953)

- Мића Јовановић
- Born: 28 January 1953 (age 73); Knjaževac, FPR Yugoslavia
- Occupation: Businessman
- Known for: Founder of Megatrend University

Mića Jovanović (Serbian Cyrillic: Мића Јовановић, born 28 January 1953) is a Serbian businessman and university professor. He is the founder and long-time head of Belgrade's Megatrend University. He resigned the position in 2014 after allegations that he had falsely claimed to have a doctorate from the London School of Economics and had supervised a plagiarized thesis. In 2019, Jovanović was once again elected as rector of Megatrend.

== Early life ==
Jovanović was born in Knjaževac, Eastern Serbia (then part of FPR Yugoslavia), on 28 January 1953. He completed high school in Bor (1972) and graduated from the Faculty of Political Sciences of the University of Belgrade (1976). He got his magister degree in the fields of sociology of work from the same school (1979). Jovanović stated that he gained his PhD degree at the University of Maribor (Slovenia) in 1991 in the field of organizational studies.

== University career ==
Between 1976 and 1991, Jovanović was employed at the University of Belgrade (with interruptions due to his engagements in the United Kingdom), and from 1991 at Megatrend Business School; he became a university professor there in 1996. Between 1997 and 1999, he was the Dean of the Faculty of Management in Zaječar. In 1999, he became Rector of Megatrend University of Belgrade.

From 1983 until 1989, Jovanović gave lectures on self-management and work motivation at various foreign universities: London School of Economics (1983), Bradford University (1983), Portsmouth Polytechnic (1983), Freie Universität Berlin (1987), Okayama University, Japan (1989), University of Tokyo (1991), École supérieure de commerce, Grenoble (1997), Seoul National University (1998). Between 1983 and 1989, he was a member of the research team of the Massachusetts Institute of Technology, in the project called "The Future of Work in the Automotive Industry with a View to an Impact of Robotization to the Labour."

Jovanović founded Megatrend University in 1989, which has since been called a "degree mill," and is one of a number of private universities in Serbia with "reputations for quick, rather than quality, education and links to political parties." The university was funded by war profiteers from Slobodan Milošević's party and money from tuition fees was used to fund planes and yachts for Jovanović and others.

== Controversy ==
In June 2014, British-based Serbian academics criticized the doctoral dissertation of Nebojša Stefanović, Minister of Internal Affairs of Serbia, and Jovanović's protégé. Jovanović responded by calling the critics "so-called scientists" who were questioning his credibility "with all that I have behind me as a scientist." In response, a law lecturer at the University of Nottingham, Dr. Marko Milanović, challenged Jovanović's claim to have a PhD from the London School of Economics (LSE). Jovanović later resigned as Rector of Megatrend University after being urged to do so by the Serbian Minister of Education. The original story in the Serbian media reported a statement by him that he had obtained his doctorate studying under the "famous professor Stephen Wood of the London School of Economics." Wood confirmed that a dissertation had been submitted but that it had been rejected. LSE and the University of London also denied that they had granted Jovanović a doctorate.

Subsequently, Jovanović left Serbia in 2014, saying that he had "no intention of doing anything more in Serbia." Jovanović later returned to Megatrend, and was again elected its rector in 2019.

== Selected bibliography ==
=== Books ===
- Sociologija samoupravljanja, Tribina, Beograd, 1982.
- 69 lekcija o menadžmentu, Megatrend, Beograd, 1991.
- Work Motivation and Self-Management, Megatrend IEC, London, 2002.
- Interkulturni menadžment, Megatrend univerzitet, Beograd, 2002.
- Biznis kao umetnost življenja, Megatrend univerzitet, Beograd, 2008.
- Business as Life Style, Megatrend International Expert Consortium Limited, London, 2008.
- Uvod u biznis, Megatrend, univerzitet, Beograd, 2008.
- Radna motivacija u prvim godinama sovjetske vlasti – istorijski esej iz XX veka, Megatrend univerzitet, Beograd, 2008.
- Um caruje – Istorija Megatrend univerziteta, Megatrend univerzitet, Beograd, 2010.
- Lifestyle in Globalization (ed.), Megatrend University, Belgrade, 2013.

=== Co-authored books ===
- What is Behind the Japanese Miracle (with Sung-Jo Park), Megatrend IEC, London–Berlin–Tokyo, 1992.
- Organizaciono ponašanje (with Mirjana Petković), Megatrend / Ekonomski fakultet Univerziteta u Beogradu, 1992.
- Strategijski menadžment (with Ana Langović), Megatrend univerzitet, Beograd, 2001.
- Upravljanje projektima (with Ana Langović), Megatrend univerzitet, Beograd, 2001.
- Organizaciono ponašanje (with Momčilo Živković and Tatjana Cvetkovski), Megatrend univerzitet, Beograd, 2003.
- Upravljanje ljudskim resursima (with Živko Kulić and Tatjana Cvetkovski), Megatrend univerzitet, Beograd, 2004.
- Preduzetništvo (with Momčilo Živković and Ana Langović), Megatrend univerzitet, Beograd, 2004.
- Interkulturni izazovi globalizacije (with Ana Langović), Megatrend univerzitet, Beograd, 2006.
- Global Cultural and Economic Research (with Sung-Jo Park), Lit Verlag, Berlin, 2006.
- System Transformation in Comparative Perspektive (with Lee Dalgon, Oh Yeon-Cheon, Sung-Jo Parkom, Bernhard Seligerom), Lit Verlag, Berlin, 2006.
- Pre Velikog praska (with Igor Bogdanoff and Grichka Bogdanoff), Megatrend univerzitet, Beograd, 2006.
