= Saint-Lary, Gers =

Saint-Lary
- Commune
- Location of Saint-Lary
- Location within France Location within Occitanie
- Coordinates: 43°43′25″N 0°30′01″E
- Country: France
- Region: Occitania
- Department: Gers
- Arrondissement: Auch
- Canton: Gascogne-Auscitaine
- Intercommunality: CA Grand Auch Cœur Gascogne

Government
  - Mayor (2020–2026): Bernard Cahuzac
- Area^{1}: 9.67 km^{2} (3.73 sq mi)
- Elevation: 182 m (597 ft)
- Highest elevation: 260 m (850 ft)
- Lowest elevation: 156 m (512 ft)
- Population (2023): 271
  - Density: 28.0/km^{2} (72.6/sq mi)
- Demonym(s): Saint-Larien, Saint-Larienne
- Time zone: UTC+01:00 (CET)
  - Summer (DST): UTC+02:00 (CEST)
- INSEE/Postal code: 32384 /32360
- ^{1} French Land Register data, which excludes lakes, ponds, glaciers > 1 km^{2} (0.386 sq mi or 247 acres) and river estuaries.

Saint-Lary (French pronunciation: [sɛ̃ laʁi]; Gascon: Sent Lari), known as Saint-Lary-du-Gers (pronounced [sɛ̃ laʁi dy ʒɛʁs]; Occitan: Sent Lari de Gers) for disambiguation, is a commune in the Gers department, and the region of Occitania, southwestern France.

The inhabitants of the commune are known as Saint-Lariens (masculine plural) and Saint-Lariennes (feminine plural).

== Geography ==
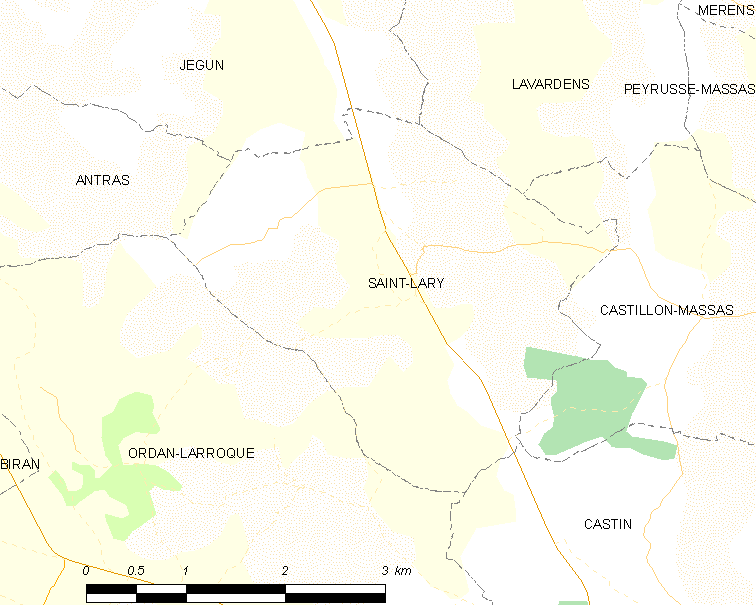
Saint-Lary and its surrounding communes

== Population ==
Historical population
Year	Pop.	±% p.a.
1968	154	—
1975	134	−1.97%
1982	141	+0.73%
1990	174	+2.66%
1999	194	+1.22%
2007	231	+2.21%
2012	281	+4.00%
2017	279	−0.14%
2023	271	−0.48%
Source: INSEE

== Buildings and monuments ==
The Pile of Saint-Lary is a Gallo-Roman stone tower and listed Monument historique.

== See also ==
- Communes of Gers
