= Dennis Overbye =

American astrophysicist and science journalist

Dennis Overbye (born June 2, 1944, in Seattle, Washington) is an American science writer specializing in physics and cosmology and was the cosmic affairs correspondent for The New York Times.

== Biography ==
Overbye received his B.S. in physics from MIT—where he was a member of the Alpha Mu chapter of Phi Kappa Sigma—in 1966. He started work towards a master's degree in astronomy from UCLA in 1970.

Overbye started his career by working as a scientist for Boeing and then other companies. In 1976 he became assistant editor at Sky and Telescope magazine. From 1976 to 1980 he was a senior editor at Discover magazine. Subsequently, he embarked on a freelance career, during which time he published articles in Time, Science, the Los Angeles Times, and The New York Times, among other publications.

He has written two books: Lonely Hearts of the Cosmos, about scientists and their quest to understand the universe, and Einstein in Love, dealing with Albert Einstein's youth and the controversy surrounding the degree to which Einstein's first wife, Mileva Marić, contributed to the theory of relativity. He joined the staff of The New York Times in 1998 as deputy science editor, then switched to full-time writing. In 2014 he was a finalist for the Pulitzer Prize for Explanatory Reporting. Overbye retired from his position as cosmic affairs correspondent for the New York Times in December, 2024.

== Books ==
- Lonely Hearts of the Cosmos: The Scientific Quest for the Secret of the Universe, Harper-Collins (1991), ISBN 0-06-015964-2 & ISBN 0-330-29585-3 (finalist, Nation Book Critics Circle Award for non-fiction). Second edition (with new afterword), Back Bay, 1999.
- Einstein in Love: A Scientific Romance, Viking (2000), ISBN 0-670-89430-3

== Awards ==
- American Institute of Physics Science Writing Award, 1980 and 1992
- American Association for the Advancement of Science Science Journalism Award, 2005 (for large newspaper writing)
- American Institute of Physics Andrew Gemant Award, 2026
