= Politics: A Work in Constructive Social Theory =

- Cover of False Necessity
- Author: Roberto Mangabeira Unger
- Genre: Political theory
- Published: 1987
- Pages: 661 (Vol. 1); 256 (Vol. 2); 231 (Vol. 3)
- ISBN: 978-1-85984-331-4 (Vol. 1); 978-1-84467-515-7 (Vol. 2); 978-1-84467-516-5 (Vol. 3)
- Preceded by: The Critical Legal Studies Movement
- Followed by: What Should Legal Analysis Become?

Politics: A Work in Constructive Social Theory is a 1987 book by Brazilian philosopher and politician Roberto Mangabeira Unger. In the book, Unger sets out a theory of society as artifact, attempting to complete what he describes as an unfinished revolution, begun by classic social theories such as Marxism, against the naturalistic premise in the understanding of human life and society. Politics was published in three volumes: False Necessity: Anti-Necessitarian Social Theory in the Service of Radical Democracy, the longest volume, is an explanatory and programmatic argument of how society might be transformed to be more in keeping with the context-smashing potential of the human imagination; Social Theory: Its Situation and Its Task, is a "critical introduction" that delves into issues of social science underpinning Unger's project; and Plasticity Into Power: Comparative-Historical Studies on the Institutional Conditions of Economic and Military Success, is a collection of three historical essays illuminating the theoretical points Unger advanced in the first two volumes. In 1997, an abridged, one-volume edition of Politics was issued as Politics, The Central Texts, edited by Zhiyuan Cui.

== Volume 1: False Necessity: Anti-Necessitarian Social Theory in the Service of Radical Democracy ==
In False Necessity, Unger presents both an explanatory theory of society and a program for the reform of society as a radical democracy that respects the ability of human beings continually to outreach, subvert, and remake their contexts. Unger proposes an "empowered democracy" that is structured so that it is maximally open to revision, a form of organization Unger calls "structure-revising structure." As Unger explains, "[a]s an explanatory theory of society, False Necessity seeks to free social explanation from dependence upon the denial of our freedom to resist and to remake our forms of social life. It carries to extremes the thesis that everything in society is politics, mere politics...." Unger argues that "the best hope for the advancement of the radical cause—the cause that leftists share with liberals—lies in a series of revolutionary reforms in the organization of governments and economies and in the character of our personal relations."

The explanatory theory in False Necessity focuses on cycles of reform and retrenchment in the West after World War II—particularly the repetitive nature of ordinary social conflict—in which there seem to be few options for major social change. Radical reform movements seem inevitably to fail even when they manage to achieve control of the government, due to a combination of business disinvestment and the bickering and jockeying for advantage among different groups of workers. Unger advances a hypothesis and analysis of a formative contexts that explain these stubborn cycles of reform and retrenchment. Formative contexts include the institutional arrangements and imaginative presuppositions that shape people's routines, and give certain groups mastery over the wealth, power, and knowledge in society. Unger lays a groundwork for the programmatic argument by analyzing certain possibilities in the state and in the microstructure of society—the extension of rights to guarantee the inviolability of the individual against government oppression and to meet basic material needs; the patron-client relationship as an example of a replacement of the impersonal by the personal; and a flexible variant of rationalized collective labor as a mode of work organization that breaks down the barrier between task-definers and task-executors in the workplace. Unger employs the concept of negative capability to describe the quality of freedom that emerges from liberating ourselves from rigid roles and hierarchies that compose part of society's formative contexts, and notes that one limitation on remaking contexts is the difficulty of combining institutions embodying different levels of negative capability into a single context. Unger concludes the explanatory section by setting forth an institutional genealogy of contemporary formative contexts and a theory of context making, both of which offer insight that can be used in remaking society.

In the programmatic section of False Necessity, Unger seeks to merge the modernist visionary's criticism of personal relations with the leftist's critique of collective institutions, in a program for empowered democracy. Despite the natural affinity between modernism and leftism, according to Unger, these two movements have been separated for too long, to the detriment of transformative politics. Unger justifies empowered democracy as the system that will embody the "superliberalism" that Unger sees as the surest way to bring about human empowerment, in a state that is not hostage to faction and where society is an artifact of will, not a product of institutional fetishism adhering to past compromises and outmoded institutions. Unger describes the "transformative movement" in its quest for empowered democracy, and sketches the principles that would inform the empowered democracy as he envisions it: institutions that are less plagued by deadlock, that decentralize the exercise of power, that represent overlapping functions, and are designed to lead to swift resolution of impasse. The institutions that embody these principles include a rotating capital fund giving broad access to society's investment capital to teams of workers, a series of innovative rights (such as market rights, immunity rights, destabilization rights, and solidarity rights) that guarantee the individual's dignity, security, and right to participate fully in the economy and government of society and would be enforced by government departments charged with intervening to destabilize unjust accumulations of wealth and power.

Unger completes the programmatic argument by describing a "cultural-revolutionary counterpart to the institutional program," arguing that such a cultural revolution is necessary since politics always comes down to the relations of individuals to each other. Finally, Unger describes the "spirit" of the constitution of empowered democracy as embodied in three principles: as a superstructure that has a structure-destroying effect; as a form of empowerment that allows us to loosen the bonds of our contexts over our activities and undermines any belief in a canonical list of forms of association between people; and as a kind of society that fulfills "the desire to do justice to the human heart, to free it from indignity and satisfy its hidden and insulted longing for greatness in a fashion it need not be fearful or ashamed of."

== Volume 2: Social Theory: Its Situation and Its Task ==
In Social Theory: Its Situation and Its Task, subtitled "A Critical Introduction to Politics," Unger lays out the theoretical background of Politics with a critical assessment of the situation of social thought, specifically by examining and describing the history and failures of classical social theory which Unger seeks to remedy in Politics. Unger describes the trajectory of social theory in the twentieth century as one in which the projects of liberalism and socialism went part of the way toward liberating people from false necessity, but he contends that "no one has ever taken the idea of society as artifact to the hilt." Unger describes the situation in the late twentieth century, the time during which he was writing Politics, as "a circumstance of theoretical exhaustion and political retrenchment," which he seeks to redefine as "a gathering of forces for a new and more powerful assault upon superstition and despotism."

The theoretical framework that Unger offers, as a substitute for classical social theory, is one that rejects naturalistic and historicist assumptions that view us as "helpless puppets of the social worlds we build and inhabit or of the lawlike forces that have supposedly brought these worlds into being." Unger maintains that his programmatic arguments

reinterpret and generalize the liberal and leftist endeavor by freeing it from unjustifiably restrictive assumptions about the practical institutional forms that representative democracies, market economies, and the social control of economic accumulation can and should assume.

Unger notes that "Politics sets out to execute a program for which no ready-made mode of discourse exists," and that thus it "raids many disciplines" and develops a "language for a vision" as it moves forward.

In discussing the predicament of social theory and offering his corrections to its failings, Unger suggests that the difficulties of social theory can be traced to the difficulty of accounting for the context-breaking nature of human life. Unger contends that it is necessary to disengage social theory from a style of explanation that treats human thought and action as though they are bound by a describable structure or society as though it is governed by a set of lawlike evolution. Unger does not claim that his proposals constitute the only way to end the tyranny of false necessity. Rather, Unger says, he is offering one possible way, and that the project of reforming society is one that we must undertake step-by-step:

Social Theory: Its Situation and Its Task merely suggests a route that Politics actually clears and follows. The modest beginning serves as a reminder that we do not need a developed social theory to begin criticizing and correcting liberal, leftist, and modernist ideas. Instead, our attempts to combine, step by step, revised ideals and changed understandings can themselves help build such a theory.

Unger offers several "points of departure" that, he contends, lead to the same point: the point at which we recognize the necessity of creating a social theory that accounts for human context-transcending ability and thus seeks a way to create social structures that enable their own revision. Of these available points of departure, Unger devotes the most attention to the situation of contemporary social thought: namely, the shortcomings of positivist social science (represented by mainstream economics) and the deep-structure social theory (represented by Marxism), each of which fail, in different ways, to account properly for the true nature of formative contexts and thus offer unsatisfactory solutions to the dilemmas of human life and social organization.

Reminding the reader that "[t]his book works toward a social theory that pushes to extremes the idea that everything in society is frozen or fluid politics," Unger explains the philosophical and scientific setting for his antinaturalistic, politicized social theory. He marshals examples from philosophy to support his argument, looking closely at the concepts of necessity and contingency to show that there is no aspect of our knowledge that is immune to empirical revision, and that we can always find "more to be true than we can yet prove, verify, or even make sense of." Unger also points to an embarrassment of historical explanation, namely the constraint that historical particularity imposes upon general explanations. This philosophical discussion supports Unger's argument against social theories that would hold that we are puppets of our circumstances or that our thoughts or actions are ever finally constrained by our contexts.

== Volume 3: Plasticity Into Power: Comparative-Historical Studies on the Institutional Conditions of Economic and Military Success ==
Plasticity Into Power consists of three convergent essays that help to illustrate, through the marshaling of historical examples, the anti-necessitarian social theory that Unger advanced in False Necessity and Social Theory. Unger explains that his approach in Plasticity Into Power "shows that we do not need to predefine possible trajectories of large-scale, discontinuous structural change in order to understand what happens in history ... It enlarges our sense of the real and the possible. It places explanatory ambition on the side of an acceptance of contingency and an openness to novelty."

In the first essay, "The Periodic Breakdown of Governments and Economies in Agrarian-Bureaucratic Societies: Its Causes, Antidotes, and Lessons," Unger examines the reversion crises experienced by agrarian-bureaucratic empires, in which periods of commercial vitality were followed by decommercialization, breakdown of government, and reversion to a non-monetary economy. Unger contends that these reversion cycles resulted from a situation in which governments were unwilling to side decisively with the peasantry against the oligarchy. Unger discusses the solutions to reversion crises in Western Europe, Japan, China, and Russia, concluding that the Western European and Japanese paths out of the reversion cycle were highly successful, though achieved through a period of unchecked conflict in which the peasantry never met the combined force of the government and the oligarchy. Unlike the accidental trajectory of Europe and Japan's escape from reversion, China achieved escape from reversion through statecraft, by the adaptation of institutions, practices and attitudes of China's nomadic conquerors to meet the challenge of freeing central government from control or immobilization by landowning elites. Russia's path out of reversion was a deeply flawed one, achieved only in a way that robbed it of potential for economic revolution. From his analyses of these varied paths out of the reversion cycle, Unger concludes that societywide social hierarchies create steep hurdles to dealing with society's practical problems, and also create obstacles to social experiments that would lead to breakthroughs in a society's productive powers.

In the second essay, "Wealth and Force: An Antinecessitarian Analysis of the Protection Problem," Unger looks at the problem nations face in turning their wealth into a military force:

There has never been a single, riskless method for turning the wealth of a country, a faction, or a family into military force. On the contrary, the efforts to secure wealth against violence (or the threat of violence), and to get violence for wealth and wealth for violence, present hard problems.

Unger looks at two prevailing approaches to the protection problem throughout history: the quasi-autarkic empire, in which most trade takes place within the boundaries of a territory ruled by a single government, and the overlord-peddler partnership, in which trade and production are carried out in territories that a number of authorities rule and tax. Unger points to the flaws of each of these approaches to the protection problem, and contends that neither approach was successful in Europe, where a third approach was developed, one that capitalized on the mutual reinforcement of force and wealth. Increases in the productivity of labor and in the deadliness of weaponry gave European countries a decisive edge over others, and circumstances aligned so that society's elites were able to unify against the working classes below them. Furthermore, the intense geopolitical rivalry among European states created an urgency for reforms that would help the state enlist force in support of wealth without crushing the productive sector of society under the costs of such defense. Unger emphasizes that the successful European solutions were "inseparable from the accumulations of these circumstances—technological, social, and geopolitical. To aim beyond the imperial-autarkic or the overlord-enterprise schemes ... other societies would have had to formulate different responses, suited to their own conditions."

In the final essay, "Plasticity Into Power: Social Conditions of Military Success," Unger focuses on the social conditions that give rise to breakthroughs in military capacity. Viewing "destruction as a mirror of production," Unger maintains that there is less theoretical prejudice in the field of military history than in the field of economics. He contends that the study of military history provides an illuminating perspective on themes of plasticity and institutional indeterminacy that he has explored throughout Politics. His focus in this essay is on the institutions and conditions that have favored or disfavored advances in military capability. Unger looks at the examples of Mamluk armies in their 16th century war against the Ottomans, and the Norman crusaders who were defeated at the hands of the Seljuqs in the last years of the eleventh century A.D. For the Mamluks (who rejected the adoption of firearms) and the Normans (who were unwilling to change their operational style of warfare in the face of the superior mobility of the Seljuqs), failure to transform led to their doom. Unger then considers examples from preindustrial European history and later Asian history to emphasize the importance of mastering "an art of institutional dismemberment and recombination," an art that helps societies negotiate the linkage, on the one hand, of practical capabilities with immediate organizational setting of those capabilities, and on the other hand, the link between a way of organizing work to a more comprehensive set of arrangements in government and the economy. Unger concludes by suggesting that

The military examples suggest that the repeated practice of institutional dissociation and recombination is not a random walk. It has—or at least, it has often had—a direction. Practiced long and often enough, it moves societies toward greater plasticity.... [M]ovement toward this ideal has generally brought success to the individuals, groups, and countries that have achieved it.

Unger concludes by acknowledging that there is a final ambiguity to be discerned in the relationship between the imperatives of plasticity and institutional sequence. Does plasticity converge toward particular ways of organizing work and the activities of production and destruction, or is there an indefinitely large ways of organizing them? "We do not know the answers to these questions," Unger writes, and goes on to say that "[w]e can turn [plasticity] into a foothold for our attempts to make our social contexts nourish our context-revising powers and respect our context-transcending vocation."

== Reception ==
=== Northwestern University Law Review Symposium on Unger's Politics ===
Politics was the subject of a 1987 symposium in the Northwestern University Law Review, which was later published in book form as Critique and Construction: A Symposium on Roberto Unger's Politics.

Richard Rorty praised Politics highly, writing that Unger "does not give the last word to the time he lives in. He also lives in an imaginary, lightly sketched, future. This is the sort of world romantics should live in; their living there is the reason why they and their confused, utopian, unscientific, petty bourgeois followers can, occasionally, make the actual future better for the rest of us." Rorty went on to say, "Unger's book offers a wild surmise, a set of concrete suggestions for risky social experiments, and a polemic against those who think the world has grown too old to be saved by such risk-taking."

Jonathan Turley, writing in the Northwestern Symposium, praised Politics, observing that "like the great majority of Unger's work, [it] penetrates its subject matter at the deepest level, analyzing the very language and foundation of social theory.... Unger's comprehensive theories and writings have implications for virtually all disciplines and professions."

Legal scholar Milner Ball described Politics as "a Theory of Everything. There is sweep and brilliance to Politics. It is illuminating as well as affecting." However, Ball went on to express reservations about Politics, contending that it

undercuts the very response it seeks to elicit.... The writing grows remote and abstract, with everything done by the author in cold terms. Nothing is left for the reader but to observe and try to take it in.... Unger recruits us for a grand journey of the mind into hope and action, but as the theory lifts and spirals toward heaven, we are left behind to marvel and applaud at a distance, for this can only be a solo voyage.

William A. Galston wrote of Politics: "I have never before encountered prose crafted so relentlessly in the prophetic mode, so incessantly proffering universal truths." But Galston argued that a flaw in Politics is that "Unger implicitly claims for himself an exemption from contextuality: whatever may be true for others, his own prophetic powers have achieved the status of absolute understanding."

Cass R. Sunstein conceded that Unger's proposals in Politics

are designed to generate a more vigorous public life and overcome the entrenched quality of the existing distribution of power and the existing set of preferences. The basic approach, however, lacks clear foundations. "Context smashing" and "self-assertion" are not intrinsic goods; their desirability depends on a substantive conception distinguishing between contexts that promote autonomy, welfare, or virtue and those that do not. Moreover, Unger's system underestimates the dangers of putting everything "up for grabs," the risks of factionalism, the possibilities of deliberative democracy, and the facilitative functions of constitutionalism. A system in which fundamental issues are constantly open to "fighting" and "conflict" is likely to be undermined by powerful, well-organized private groups and by self-interested representatives.

=== Other reviews and considerations ===
William E. Connolly offered a highly laudatory review in The New York Times, writing:

Politics soars into the rarefied stratosphere of social theory, striving to realize the highest aspirations of modernity itself. Mr. Unger is thus best understood in relation to contemporaries who reach for similar heights, such as the European thinkers Hans Blumenberg, Jurgen Habermas and Michel Foucault.... [T]he unusual combination of theoretical acuity and detail in these volumes is a brilliant contribution to social thought. Each time Mr. Unger offers a new proposal, settled assumptions and priorities are questioned with new intensity. The rapid accumulation of such proposals exposes the finely spun threads binding the prosaic world of political reform to the rarefied heights of theoretical imagination. Finally, the relentless specification of a vision that most moderns share inchoately exposes precisely what people must do (and believe) to pursue freedom through mastery. This freedom may not be able to bear its own reflection after looking into the mirror Mr. Unger holds up to it.

A chapter of Perry Anderson's book A Zone of Engagement was devoted to Unger's Politics. The chapter was called "Roberto Unger and the Politics of Empowerment." Anderson wrote, "For sheer imaginative attack, Unger's program for social reconstruction has no contemporary counterpart. It certainly honors its promise to advance beyond—far beyond—the ambitions of social democracy."

== See also ==
- Political theory
- Social theory

== Sources ==
- Anderson, Perry (1992). A Zone of Engagement. New York: Verso. ISBN 978-0860915959.
- Ball, Milner (Summer 1987). "The City of Unger". Northwestern University Law Review. 81 (4): 625–663.
- Connolly, William (February 7, 1988). "Making the Friendly World Behave". The New York Times. p. 26.
- Galston, William (Summer 1987). "False Universality: Infinite Personality and Finite Existence in Unger's Politics". Northwestern University Law Review. 81 (4): 751–765.
- Lovin, Robin W.; Perry, Michael J. (1990). Critique and Construction: A Symposium on Roberto Unger's Politics. Cambridge: Cambridge University Press. ISBN 978-0521352086.
- Perry, Michael J., ed. (Summer 1987). "A Symposium on Roberto Unger's Politics". Northwestern University Law Review. 81 (4).
- Rorty, Richard (Winter 1988). "Unger, Castoriadis, and the Romance of a National Future". Northwestern University Law Review. 82: 335–351.
- Sunstein, Cass (Summer 1987). "Routine and Revolution". Northwestern University Law Review. 81 (4): 869–893.
- Turley, Jonathan (Summer 1987). "The Hitchhiker's Guide to CLS, Unger, and Deep Thought". Northwestern University Law Review. 81 (4): 593–620.
- Unger, Roberto Mangabeira (1987a). False Necessity: Anti-Necessitarian Social Theory in the Service of Radical Democracy (Volume 1 of Politics: A Work in Constructive Social Theory). Cambridge: Cambridge University Press. ISBN 978-1859843314.
- Unger, Roberto Mangabeira (1987c). Plasticity into Power: Comparative-Historical Studies on the Institutional Conditions of Economic and Military Success (Volume 3 of Politics: A Work in Constructive Social Theory). Cambridge: Cambridge University Press. ISBN 978-1844675166.
- Unger, Roberto Mangabeira (1987b). Social Theory: Its Situation and Its Task (Volume 2 of Politics: A Work in Constructive Social Theory). Cambridge: Cambridge University Press. ISBN 978-1844675159.
- Unger, Roberto Mangabeira (1997). Cui, Zhiyuan (ed.). Politics: The Central Texts. New York: Verso. ISBN 978-1859841310.
