= The Self Awakened =

2007 book by Roberto Mangabeira Unger

The Self Awakened: Pragmatism Unbound
- Author: Roberto Mangabeira Unger
- Language: English
- Genre: Philosophy
- Publisher: 2007 (Harvard University Press)
- Publication place: United States
- Pages: 277
- ISBN: 978-0-674-02354-3 (hardcover); 978-0-674-03496-9 (paperback)
- OCLC: 63680074
- LC Class: B832.U55 2006
- Preceded by: What Should the Left Propose?
- Followed by: Free Trade Reimagined

The Self Awakened: Pragmatism Unbound is a 2007 book by philosopher and politician Roberto Mangabeira Unger. In the book, Unger sets forth a theory of human nature, a philosophical view of time, nature and reality, and a proposal for changes to social and political institutions so that they best nourish the context-transcending quality that Unger sees at the core of human existence. Written in a prophetic and poetic manner that drew comparison with the work of Whitman and Emerson, and delving into issues of humankind's existential predicament in a manner that one critic found evocative of Sartre, The Self Awakened also serves as a summation of many of the core principles of Unger's work.

== Overview ==
Unger opens the book by describing the predicament of human beings, who are born into a particular world and constrained by particular contexts, but also possess the ability to resist and subvert the given structures of organization and belief in which they find themselves. He asks, what should our attitude be toward these contexts—the structures and institutions that, at the same time, seem to confine us but never fully contain our ability to subvert them? The dominant response to this situation has been a set of beliefs commonly referred to as the "perennial philosophy", which holds that the world of appearance and distinction is an illusion and that true reality is a single, changeless being or divinity.

Imagination over dogma, vulnerability over serenity, aspiration over obligation, comedy over tragedy, hope over experience, prophecy over memory, surprise over repetition, the personal over the impersonal, time over eternity, life over everything.

— Roberto Mangabeira Unger, The Self Awakened, p. 237

Unger contends that the perennial philosophy is an unsatisfactory response to the human situation, because it rests on a denial of transformation, difference, and time, all of which he considers central to a meaningful life. The perennial philosophy calls for a diminution of intensity in life, in contrast to the life of risk and engagement that Unger advocates. Unger contends that the most fruitful and promising philosophical position for enhancing human freedom is a form of radicalized pragmatism. Rejecting the distorted pragmatism that disguises insights about humanity as insights about knowledge and being, Unger's radicalized pragmatism celebrates the primacy of the personal over the impersonal and an ethic of vulnerability over a striving for invulnerability. After setting forth his theory of humanity and arguing for radicalized pragmatism, Unger then sets forth a program for the renovation of society in the spheres of democracy, social life, religion, and philosophy, all of which he urges would be transformed for the benefit of humanity by practices of experimentalism, heightened vulnerability, and a social endowment fund that gives people the security to embrace these attitudes and practices.

== Key ideas ==
The following ideas are central to Unger's argument in The Self Awakened:

- The nature of human beings as context-transcending agents: What is distinctive about the human being is his ability to outreach and subvert whatever context he is in. According to Unger, social structures, to nourish the context-transcending quality of human life, must be designed so that they are open to revision. Otherwise, the dead exercise too much control over the living.
- The concept of radicalized pragmatism: Pragmatism is the most promising philosophical orientation for the radical project that Unger proposes—namely, its privileging of the personal over the impersonal, its valuing of vulnerability over invulnerability, and its definition of knowledge as whatever helps us achieve success in our projects. Unger celebrates a mindset that involves experimentation, improvisation, and risk, a way of working that looks for tools as we need them. Pragmatism in its purest form expresses that way of working and understanding. But according to Unger, the classic tradition of American pragmatism mistook an insight into human life for an insight into knowledge. He wants to "radicalize" pragmatism and return its emphasis to its central insight, which is a "personalist" philosophy.
- The rejection of the perennial philosophy: The perennial philosophy is a dead-end, according to Unger, because it seeks to dim our intensity as the price of serenity. It denies the reality of time and transformation. Unger argues that our vitality is all we have, and a philosophy that seeks to diminish our vitality is, in doing so, denying us the quality most valuable to us, the quality that makes us godlike.
- The time-drenched nature of the world: Nothing, Unger argues, is untouched by time. Even natural laws have a history, and may have changed during the history of the universe.
- The reality of difference and transformation: For us to live with vitality and fully experience our lives as context-transcending agents, Unger argues that we must embrace the reality of difference and transformation.
- The importance of experimenting with different institutional expressions of democratic ideals: Unger argues that the American expression of democratic ideals is too often distorted by an exaggerated belief in the ability of people to rise by their own efforts, without social structures in place to foster their social mobility and to provide social endowments that give them the security to take risks. Unger contends that we must experiment with social structures in an attempt to better fulfill the democratic promise.
- The future: Unger argues that we need to live for the future as a way of living in the present.
- American distortion of pragmatism: The American pragmatist tradition has mistaken its insight into humanity for an insight into epistemology and metaphysics. Unger wants to return pragmatism to an emphasis on the "personalist" dimension that he considers its most promising feature. He also contends that pragmatism was married to a form of institutional dogma, democratic perfectionism, that diminishes its message.
- The importance of an ethic of vulnerability: To foster an ethic of vulnerability, in which people are more enabled to take risks in personal connection and as enterprising, creative agents, should be a principal task of an experimentalist democracy as Unger envisions it.
- The need to reform society to make it more susceptible to transformation: Making society more susceptible to transformation would help to achieve what Unger sees as a high ideal of the kind of state he imagines: in which society is modeled on the imagination, and open to the recursive, infinite, context-transcending qualities of the human mind.
- The possibility of genuine novelty: Unger contends that the tradition of the perennial philosophy, and many other philosophical perspectives, deny the possibility of genuine novelty, and they have a diminished sense of the possibility of the "new." States of affairs, according to this diminished view, are merely penumbra of the actual, like actors waiting to come onstage. Unger, drawing upon his insight into the "time-drenched" nature of the world in which transformation is central, views genuine novelty as possible.
- Mind as imagination: The imagination is the central aspect of the mind that gives human life its context-transcending power. Three tendencies in today's humanities and social sciences—rationalization, humanization, escapism—disarm the imagination.
- Philosophy as a discipline devoted to expanding the range of things that can be said: Philosophy is neither super-science nor form of self-help, Unger argues; it is most effective when it adopts a third mission, which is to be a discipline devoted to unsettling, undermining, subverting, and expanding the range of things that can be said.
- Troublemaking and iconoclasm: The idea that people should be free and encouraged to "look for trouble," to be iconoclasts, because that is a way of living for the future as a certain way of living in the present.

== Reception ==
Lee Smolin reviewed the book in The Times Higher Education Supplement. Smolin praised the range and ambition of Unger's book: "These days, few professional academics profess the ambitions of the great philosophers of the past.... One exception to this is Roberto Mangabeira Unger, whose book The Self Awakened shows him to be one of the few living philosophers whose thinking has the range of the great philosophers of the past." Smolin assessed the book as "highly accessible to a broadly educated reader. It is written in a vivid prose style that mixes precise lawyerly argument with poetic and metaphorical passages of astounding vividness. It is a polemic and a call to action, but what it challenges us to do most of all is to experiment with how we live and think. It is many years since I found myself as inspired and provoked by a book of non-fiction." Smolin concluded: "This is a philosophy as ambitious as any being written now."

Douglas McDermid, writing in the Review of Politics, described The Self Awakened as "penned by three Roberto Ungers: a poet-preacher, a philosopher, and a political theorist." McDermid criticized The Self Awakened, saying "The book overreaches hugely: in a mere 256 pages (no bibliography, no notes, no quotations), Unger tells us what he thinks about metaphysics, epistemology, ethics, religion, science, economics, art, mathematics, society, education, politics, consciousness, nature, human nature, genetic engineering, life, and love ..." Decrying Unger's "paucity of careful argumentation," McDermid contends that "his lack of engagement with opponents real or imagined gives the volume an oddly solipsistic, self-enclosed feel—ironic, given its title." McDermid is sharply critical of Unger's use of the term "pragmatism" to describe his philosophy, stating that such a description does Unger a disservice:

In my opinion, it would be much more useful and illuminating to see him as a moralist in the tradition of Emerson. Both Emerson and Unger are buoyant optimists who preach the doctrine of "the infinitude of the private man;" both stress the epiphanic character of ordinary experience; both wage eloquent war against the tyranny of custom; both depict life as ceaseless process, as change without limit or end; and both shine when they eschew dialectic and simply speak their "latent conviction"—often in the form of memorable and arresting apothegms. In short, the best parts of The Self Awakened ... are, like the best of Emerson, simultaneously edifying and provocative, perceptive and hopeful.

Louis Groarke reviewed The Self Awakened in The Heythrop Journal. Groarke acknowledges that the book is "written with an undeniable flair and a cosmopolitan eloquence, incorporating different aspects of a socially-progressive ideology into a comprehensive metaphysics." But Groarke contends that "[t]he knowledgeable reader will find nothing that has not been said, many times over, by other authors in more precise or compelling terms. This is not truly original work. Unger does not undertake the hard work of rigorous, objective argument."

Ruth Levitas considers both The Self Awakened and Democracy Realized in her article "Pragmatism, Utopia, and Anti-Utopia". Levitas writes that "[t]he radical potential of pragmatism is made explicit" in The Self Awakened. Comparing The Self Awakened to Richard Rorty's Achieving Our Country, Levitas writes that while both authors adopt a pragmatist approach to advancing progressive aims, Levitas writes that Unger distances himself from Rorty's "shrunken pragmatism" which is associated with a kind of "democratic perfectionism ... that effectively denies the alterability of social life, fetishizing a particular set of institutional arrangements." Contrary to Rorty's "anti-utopian" perspective, Levitas writes, Unger "may actually be utopian in the best sense of the word."

Levitas also considered The Self Awakened in an essay on the legacy of May '68. She contends that the utopian energies unleashed by the events of May '68 have been "largely extinguished," but refers to Unger's ideas in The Self Awakened as a rare contemporary manifestation of the May '68 spirit.

The quest for alternative futures needs to ... lead to politically effective action. Roberto Unger has suggested that this action leads to a kind of utopian pragmatism—improvisation of new institutions, new social processes, new ways of being. Unger argues for a sense of prophetic identity, which runs counter to contemporary politics of identity and does resonate with the sense of ’68: we should define ourselves in terms of what we might become, not where we came from.

Martin Stone offered sharply qualified praise for The Self Awakened in Notre Dame Philosophical Reviews. Stone described the book as

vintage Unger: exhortative, deeply romantic, full of moral intensity, relentlessly hopeful, marginal to professional philosophy. The work is part essay (after Emerson or the German romantics), part sermon, part political manifesto, and part critical theory. It is a left-romantic-existential-political Wake-Up Call. There is an American optimism and energy about it too. It seems more spiritually akin to Whitman or Emerson than to the "Pragmatists" it celebrates.

Stone also praised the vivid quality of Unger's writing: "The sound of the writing is one of Unger's signatures—the Epistle to the Romans meets the lawyer's appellate brief. And that is no accident. It's part of Unger's ambition to bring visionary modes of thought—those which are sometimes called prophetic or poetic—closer to the language of institutional rationality." But Stone criticizes Unger's way of grappling with philosophical problems, arguing that his philosophical method is at odds with his message of plasticity, transcendence, and encounter:

Although its ideas are solidarity and sympathy, Unger's writing is notably impatient and dismissive, obliterating where it should criticize or respond. It speaks of the radical potential in personal encounter, but it overpowers the other by netting him in the many "theses" and "alternative views" that rigidly structure its intellectual space. Wanting plasticity and availability to experience, it freezes and fixates ....

Stone concludes that The Self Awakened is "[i]nspiring in the survey it offers of Western thought, as well as in its radicalization of liberal political themes," but that "it is bound both to excite and disappoint the philosophical reader."

== See also ==
- Passion: An Essay on Personality
- The Singular Universe and the Reality of Time
- The Religion of the Future

== Sources ==
- Groarke, Louis (2012). "Review of The Self Awakened: Pragmatism Unbound". The Heythrop Journal. 53 (3): 531–532. doi:10.1111/j.1468-2265.2011.00729_25.x.
- Levitas, Ruth (2008a). "Be Realistic: Demand the Impossible". New Formations: A Journal of Culture, Theory & Politics. 65 (65): 78–93. doi:10.3898/NEWF.65.05.2008.
- Levitas, Ruth (May 2008b). "Pragmatism, Utopia, and Anti-Utopia". Critical Horizons: A Journal of Philosophy and Social Theory. 9 (1): 42–59. doi:10.1558/crit.v9i1.42. S2CID 144761406.
- McDermid, Douglas (Spring 2008). "Review of The Self Awakened: Pragmatism Unbound". The Review of Politics. 70 (2): 306–309. doi:10.1017/s0034670508000429. S2CID 146591766.
- Smolin, Lee (August 31, 2007). "No Eternal Truths, Just Divine Advancements". Times Higher Education Supplement.
- Stone, Martin (August 1, 2007). "Review of The Self Awakened: Pragmatism Unbound". Notre Dame Philosophical Reviews.
- Unger, Roberto Mangabeira (2007). The Self Awakened: Pragmatism Unbound. Cambridge: Harvard University Press.
