= The Religion of the Future =

2014 book by Roberto Mangabeira Unger

- Author: Roberto Mangabeira Unger
- Language: English
- Genre: Philosophy, Theology
- Publisher: 2014 (Harvard University Press)
- Publication place: United States
- Pages: 468 pp.
- ISBN: 978-0674729070
- OCLC: 1894621682
- LC Class: BL5LU645 2014
- Preceded by: The Left Alternative
- Followed by: The Singular Universe and the Reality of Time

The Religion of the Future is a 2014 book by the Brazilian philosopher and politician Roberto Mangabeira Unger. In the book, he argues that humanity is in need of a religious revolution that dispenses with the concept of God and elements of the supernatural, a revolution that expands individual and collective human empowerment by fostering a condition he calls "deep freedom"—a life of creativity, risk, experiment, and meaningful personal connection—protected by structure-revising social and political structures of an empowered democracy hospitable to the context-breaking capacities inherent in human life.

== Overview ==
=== Background and objective ===
Unger opens the book by describing the four incurable defects of human life: death, groundlessness, insatiability, and belittlement. The major world religious traditions, although having certain elements in common, have differed in how they have dealt with these four defects of human life. Unger describes three "moments" in the evolution of religious belief: a first moment, when human life was so precarious that the flaws of existence did not occupy a central place in human consciousness; a second moment, when humans had achieved some degree of freedom from dependence on nature, allowing high culture to emerge and address the basic flaws of existence, which were now at the center of human consciousness. A hallmark of this second moment of religious belief was the common feature of religion in assuring believers that everything is alright. For the third moment to occur, Unger argues that a religious revolution is needed, a thoroughly naturalistic development of religious belief which offers no assurance that everything is alright, but offers a heightened, intensified, and more meaningful life in the present, rather than at some indefinitely postponed future time. This "religion of the future" would offer a way of confronting life without illusions.

In the next three chapters, Unger will address each of the three major world religious traditions and explain their shortcomings as inspiration and sources for the religion of the future.

=== Critique of religious tradition of "overcoming the world" ===
The religious tradition of overcoming the world, chiefly represented by Buddhism and Hinduism, is marked by a quest for serenity and benevolence. Unger contends that "overcoming the world" cannot serve as a starting point for a future religious revolution, because this tradition seeks a deliberate dimming of consciousness and vitality in its quest for serenity. The religion of the future, Unger contends, must turn toward the world, not away from it, and a religious tradition that denies time and distinction, and urges us to turn away from engagement with the world, cannot be a basis for the religious revolution Unger envisions.

=== Critique of religious tradition of "humanizing the world" ===
The tradition of humanizing the world (represented by Confucianism) is marked by a belief that humans can find their place in the world by embracing an ethic of roles and the ennoblement of our relations with each other through this ethic of roles. Unger contends that this tradition, too, is unsuited to be a starting point for the religion of the future because it gives too much weight and authority to social structures and roles that may match the dispositions only of the most virtuous, conformist members of society. The picture of human morality presented by the tradition of humanizing the world is ultimately unrealistic, Unger contends, and fails to address in a satisfactory manner the flaws in human existence.

=== Critique of religious tradition of "struggling with the world" ===
According to Unger, the religious tradition that holds the most promise as a starting point for the religion of the future is the tradition of "struggling with the world," the semitic salvific religions including Judaism, Christianity and Islam. The tradition of "struggling with the world" also has a secular voice, in the form of the major doctrines of emancipation including liberalism, socialism and democracy. The metaphysical vision of the various forms of "struggling with the world" include several points in common:

- There is one real world.
- Time is inclusively real.
- The new can happen.
- History is open.
- The self has unfathomable depth.
- The ordinary has more promise than the high-flown.

At the heart of the doctrine of the "struggle with the world," both in its religious and secular variants, is a conception of the self as embodied spirit. Unger explains a key aspect of the nature of the embodied spirit is that it can always overflow and exceed its contexts: "There is more in us, in each of us individually and in all of us collectively—the human race—than there is or ever can be in them." Unger explains how this context-transcending quality of human beings as embodied spirit is manifested in the context of the market economy, in areas of rigorous intellectual inquiry such as mathematics and physics, and in the confrontation of human beings with the enigmas of their experience in the context of religion. In each of these settings, Unger argues, we are not "ever entirely hostage to the social and conceptual worlds that have helped shape us. They may direct us over much of our lives, but they do not own us."

This view of human nature as irrepressibly context-transcending is at the heart of what Unger finds useful for the religion of the future in the doctrine of the struggle with the world, and it is this element of the doctrine that he embraces as the starting point for his vision of a religion of the future. But he finds that all of its contemporary forms, the tradition of struggling with the world is radically defective.

=== Nature of the religious revolution represented by the religion of the future ===
Unger argues that a new religious revolution would be thoroughly naturalistic and would pursue the task of enhancing life now, rather than promising salvation or reward in the indefinite future. Such a revolution would likely contain elements that resemble past religious revolutions such as visionary teaching and exemplary action, but would combined with elements unknown to the religious revolutions of the past. The religious revolution that Unger envisions would have the following qualities:

- It would not centralize prophetic power in a single individual and his decisive action in history.
- It would be concerned both with reshaping society as well as reorienting individual life.
- It would include a vision for the cumulative transformation of society that would not be reducible to a definite blueprint or formula.
- It would seek to remedy our condition of estrangement from the present moment, recognizing that time is our most precious possession, and that religion must help us transform our lives now, if only in fragmentary and inchoate form, no matter what changes are sought in the structure of society in historical time.
- It would reject the taboo on the religious criticism of religion.

=== Unger's conception of "deep freedom" and the social and political changes that would help bring it about ===
Unger sets forth the structural changes in society that would be necessary to foster the emancipatory conditions of the religion of the future, to make society more open to experiment, fulfillment, connection, and surprise. At the heart of his political proposals in this chapter is the general concept of "structure-revising structure," and the various ways that this can be embodied in political and social institutions. Unger's vision for politics in this chapter includes "heating up" the political process, creating institutional mechanisms for breaking impasse between branches of government, and increasing mass mobilization of citizens so that all have a voice in the direction and operation of government.

=== Quality of human life under the religion of the future ===
Unger speculates on the quality that life would have under the regime instituted by a future religious revolution. Individuals would become freer to innovate, experiment, take risks, and look for trouble. Connections between people would be deeper and more meaningful. Social mechanisms and safety nets would be in place that would allow and encourage this climate of experiment, risk, cooperation and love.

== Reception ==
Reviewing The Religion of the Future in the Journal of the American Academy of Religion, Andrew B. Irvine wrote that "the book demands to be read not as a contribution to scholarly debate but as a direct intervention in the most important and urgent issues of today ... No review could cover all the angles from which this book deserves to be appreciated—and criticized." Irvine contends that Unger's argument "dramatically ...simplifies the indefinitely complex data of religion, but it does so in the name of a single religious perspective." Irvine asks: "What would this book look like if it were more deeply comparative and/or interreligious in its thinking? It is comparative and interreligious, of course, but Unger's exclusivistic affirmation of the 'struggle with the world' seems insufficiently informed." Irvine concludes his review by applauding The Religion of the Future, stating that it "merits reading by philosophers, theologians, and activists, especially any who hold that a naturalistic metaphysics and praxis are vital to a flourishing human future. Its weaknesses are as instructive as its strengths."

Bonaventure Chapman, writing in the Catholic publication Dominicana, described The Religion of the Future as "a prophetic vision of any future religion," and stated that he considered the book, alongside Ronald Dworkin's Religion Without God, to be an example of "religious atheism," that is, a "new attitude to God" that "presents a new horizon for Christianity." While strongly criticizing the book from a theistic standpoint, Chapman allows that this new religious atheism may represent a "maturing of the infantile atheism offered by the scientific naturalism perspective: it looks at the world and finds moral truth, objective value, and goodness."

Reviewing The Religion of the Future in Notre Dame Philosophical Reviews, Jeremy David Bendik-Keymer considered the book as the second part of the project that Unger began in The Self Awakened: Pragmatism Unbound and concluded in The Singular Universe and the Reality of Time. Bendik-Keymer summarizes Unger's project in these works as one that "seeks a world in which we live in the present, free of repression of, or reactive attitudes towards, the existential limitations of being human and in which we act collectively to create the conditions for ongoing innovation and self-transformation" (internal citations omitted). Bendik-Keymer complains that Unger's depiction of human beings is "belittling" and concludes that Unger "has simply missed the mark... Unger may think of his work as preparation for prophesy, but it ends up as pontification."

== Quotes ==
- p. 236

The category of religion lacks any permanent core. There is no set way in which the aspects of our experience that we designate as religious relate to other aspects. That the category of religion is historical, however, does not mean that it is empty of content. Its powers of discrimination are those that the history of mankind gives it. Each major change in the content of religion inspires a change in our idea of what the term most usefully designates.

- p. 314

Deep freedom is therefore freedom, grasped and realized through change of institutions and practices: not just through a one-time change but through a practice that can generate future, ongoing change in the institutional order of society. Deep freedom is thus also freedom as understood within the bounds of what I earlier described as the conception of a free society. The idea of deep freedom develops through an interplay between the conception of a free society and the institutional arrangements required to make that conception real. The conception informs the making of the institutional alternatives. The making of the alternative prompts us to enrich and revise the conception.

- p. 349

Our comprehensive conceptions of our identity, viewed in relation to our place in nature, are not, in this account, to be understood as merely or chiefly conjectures about a natural phenomenon, as if human nature were a thing. They do not resemble the thinking that produced the standard model of particle physics or the periodic table. They are prophecies, indeed imperfectly self-fulfilling prophecies, as I have argued in my defense of the concept of religion.

== Sources ==
- Bendik-Keymer, Jeremy David (August 2014). "The Religion of the Future (book review)". Notre Dame Philosophical Reviews. 37.
- Chapman, Bonaventure (2014). "Religious Atheism and the Beautiful". Dominica. 57 (2): 7–23.
- Irvine, Andrew (June 2015). "The Religion of the Future (review)". Journal of the American Academy of Religion. 83 (2): 554–568. doi:10.1093/jaarel/lfv019.
- Unger, Roberto Mangabeira (2014). The Religion of the Future. Cambridge: Harvard University Press. ISBN 978-0674729070.
