= The Future of American Progressivism =

1999 book

The Future of American Progressivism: An Initiative for Political and Economic Reform
- Author: Roberto Mangabeira Unger; Cornel West
- Language: English
- Genre: Political theory
- Publisher: 1999 (Beacon Press)
- Publication place: United States
- Pages: 104
- ISBN: 0807043273
- OCLC: 20613970
- LC Class: JK271.U533 1998
- Preceded by: Democracy Realized: The Progressive Alternative
- Followed by: What Should the Left Propose?

The Future of American Progressivism: An Initiative for Political and Economic Reform is a 1999 book co-written by philosopher and politician Roberto Mangabeira Unger and philosopher, activist and public intellectual Cornel West. In the book, Unger and West describe a central tradition in American social thought that they call "the American religion of possibility." Arguing that economic inequality, political impasse, and increasing isolation of Americans from each other has called that tradition into question, Unger and West present a plan for increasing economic equality and deepening democracy so that the United States better fulfills the promises of the American religion of possibility.

== Reception ==
The book received largely positive reviews. According to Kirkus Reviews, Unger and West

call for democratizing the market economy and energizing representative democracy by unleashing the creative abilities of Americans. For we've always been tinkerers, people willing to experiment to find a better way.... Their concerns include the influence of money on politics. While in the past this influence was "sanctified by the judiciary as if the ability of money to talk ... were a principle rather than a wrong," it is now time for government to stop upholding this dismal system and start innovating with public financing. In a country where many Democrats aspire to be nothing more than generous Republicans, they maintain, this sort of re-emergent progressivism is needed to introduce a dose of American creativity. A bold political analysis that should inspire public life but, alas, probably will not.

Another laudatory review came from Mark Satin in the Radical Middle Newsletter, who described the book as

exceptionally bold ... exceptionally detailed.... [O]nly a couple of pages into the book you’ll realize that their principal goal is to drag the old New Left and the new "identity left," kicking and screaming, into the world of entrepreneurship, personal responsibility, and scientific and technological progress. Instead of basking in unearned self-esteem, all high school students should be expected to master a tough set of conceptual, practical, and learning skills. In short: Progressives should lead the march away from the old economy, and thereby help define the emerging new economy of "flattened hierarchies and permanent innovation."

Writing in Commonweal, Eugene McCarraher commended Unger and West's "sweeping but sensible proposals," but contended that their celebration of the practices of vanguard industry as a path for the rest of the U.S. to reach economic equality was misguided:

By describing as "religion" the practical and experimental ways in which Americans approach technology and personal relations, Unger and West highlight the mixture of prophecy and wonkery that has been the glory and the bane of the progressive tradition. They marvel at "a worldwide network of productive vanguards," at "flexibility" and "decentralization" in labor markets and production, and at the "flattened hierarchies," "fluid job definitions," and "constant reshaping of products, services, and practices" that characterize the advanced sectors of contemporary capitalism. But The Future of American Progressivism seems unaware of the ways this lexicon articulates the libertarian elitism of the "productive vanguards." .... For a couple of leftists, the authors are remarkably forgetful of the market's coercive character.

According to a New York Times article about Unger's work as a cabinet minister in Brazil, he is best known in the United States for The Future of American Progressivism.

== Sources ==
- McCarraher, Eugene (19 May 2000). "Missing: The Vision Thing". Commonweal. 127 (10): 25–27.
- Romero, Simon (27 June 2015). "Working Within the System to Disrupt Brazilian Politics". The New York Times. p. A3.
- Satin, Mark (March 2000). "Four books, four visions; or, Where have you gone, Herbert Marcuse?". Radical Middle Newsletter.
- "Review of The Future of American Progressivism by Roberto Mangabeira Unger and Cornel West". Kirkus Reviews. 15 September 1998.
- Unger, Roberto Mangabeira, and West, Cornel. The Future of American Progressivism: An Initiative for Political and Economic Reform. Beacon Press, 1999.
