= What Should Legal Analysis Become? =

1996 book by Roberto Mangabeira Unger

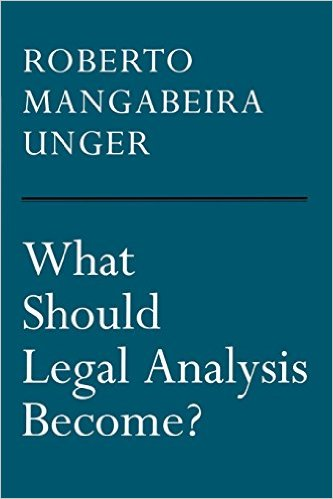
- Author: Roberto Mangabeira Unger
- Language: English
- Genre: Law
- Publisher: Verso Books
- Publication date: 1996
- Publication place: United States
- Pages: 198
- ISBN: 1-85984-969-5
- OCLC: 34192097
- LC Class: K290.U54 1996
- Preceded by: Politics: A Work In Constructive Social Theory
- Followed by: Democracy Realized: The Progressive Alternative

What Should Legal Analysis Become? is a book by philosopher and politician Roberto Mangabeira Unger. First published in 1996, the book germinated from lectures Unger gave at Yale Law School, Columbia Law School, and the London School of Economics. In the book, Unger argues that in order to transform society to be more radically democratic, it is necessary to penetrate the specialized professions so that we can talk about, and imagine, institutions effectively. Unger focuses on the legal profession in this book, setting forth a vision of law as "institutional imagination." He presents a program for changing the nature of the legal profession so that less power is vested in legal professionals and institutions, and legal analysis is reoriented to be more egalitarian and advance more effectively the democratic project.

== Reception ==
Jeremy Waldron, reviewing What Should Legal Analysis Become? in the Columbia Law Review, praised the book as an "eminently readable" text encompassing many of the same themes that Unger explored in his three-volume Politics: A Work in Constructive Social Theory. Waldron notes that Unger's argument in the book has a negative and a positive side. Waldron finds the negative side of Unger's argument—in which Unger attacks contemporary American legal analysis as "incapable of contributing to serious social reform" (as Waldron summarizes the argument)—"exciting," and states that Unger's negative argument "goes right to the heart of the difficulties about political agency that disfigure modern legal scholarship." Waldron finds the positive side of Unger's argument "somewhat less convincing." The positive argument, which contains Unger's exploration of the alternative futures of democracy, Waldron dismisses as "broad-brush sketching of some rather familiar social-democratic ideals .... [that] might have been produced by any intelligent person on the left." Waldron sums up his assessment by stating that "so far as the positive suggestions are concerned, one is left frustrated by this book. The negative account of mainstream legal analysis is provocative, and the critique of its orientation to the courts is important and timely."

Robin Bradley Kar contends that Unger's constructive program in What Should Legal Analysis Become? is inconsistent with his negative criticisms of contemporary American legal interpretation. In his review of the book in the Yale Law Journal, Kar argued that Unger's criticism of contemporary legal analysis rests on the idea that we should not rest our interpretations of law upon general "policies of collective welfare and principles of moral and political right," because such reliance works to suppress important parts of the democratic compromises that help advance radical democratic aims. But, Kar points out, Unger's constructive, positive program rests on "similarly general conceptions of democracy and human nature." Kar concludes that "Unger's entire work thus provides us with a useful moral about the dangers inherent in interpreting the law through the lens of theory."

Lorne Sossin, reviewing the book in the University of Toronto Law Journal, praised What Should Legal Analysis Become? as a "provocative and enlightening" account of "the myths and contradictions upon which our political and legal institutions rest," one that may "facilitate transforming those institutions into more emancipatory forms." Sossin notes that Unger would add "prophecy" and "vision" to the pursuits of critical theory. Sossin concludes that "What Should Legal Analysis Become? is in many ways an illustration of Unger practicing what he preaches—reinventing and recombining ideas and elements of his previous thought into a reinvigorated critique. His analysis never fails to engage, though ... it does leave important questions unanswered."

== Sources ==
- Kar, Robin Bradley. "Legal Analysis and the Perversions of Theory (review of What Should Legal Analysis Become?), 106 Yale Law Journal 2685 (1997)
- Sossin, Lorne. "The Politics of Imagination" (review of What Should Legal Analysis Become?) 47 University of Toronto Law Journal 523 (1997)
- Unger, Roberto Mangabeira. What Should Legal Analysis Become?. Verso Books, 1996.
- Waldron, Jeremy. "Dirty Little Secret" (review of What Should Legal Analysis Become?), 98 Columbia Law Review 510 (1998).
