= Free Trade Reimagined =

Free Trade Reimagined: The World Division of Labor and the Method of Economics
- Author: Roberto Mangabeira Unger
- Language: English
- Genre: Economics
- Publisher: 2007 (Princeton University Press)
- Publication place: United States
- Pages: 240
- ISBN: 9780691134291
- OCLC: 331083082
- LC Class: HF1713.U42 2007
- Preceded by: The Self Awakened: Pragmatism Unbound
- Followed by: The Left Alternative

Free Trade Reimagined: The World Division of Labor and the Method of Economics is a 2007 book by philosopher and politician Roberto Mangabeira Unger. In the book, Unger criticizes the doctrine holding that maximization of free trade should be the commanding goal of the worldwide trading regime, contending that this doctrine is misguided. Instead, Unger argues, the goal of an open worldwide trading regime should be reconciled with measures that foster national and regional diversity, deviation, heresy, and experiment in production, markets and economies. Unger further explores how the tradition of marginalism has rendered the discipline of economics incapable of offering deep insight into the problems of trade and of the global division of labor.

== Reception ==
Francisco Rodríguez wrote a detailed and laudatory review of Free Trade Reimagined for the Journal of Economic Literature. Noting that Unger "deliberately eschews" the language of economics, Rodriguez describes Unger's project in Free Trade Reimagined as follows:

Unger's critique is directed at the practical case for free trade that is premised on the theory of comparative advantage. His central contention is that the model of comparative advantage is too partial, incomplete, and empirically inaccurate to permit the drawing out of the general broad policy implications which are commonly attributed to it. Unger's interest is not in theoretical debates in economics, but rather in the broader process of formulation of trade policy and the design of the institutions of the world trading system.

Rodriguez identifies and examines the three basic points that make up Unger's central argument:

- That trade theory is fundamentally incomplete.
- That international competition and political institutions can have significant effect on technological progress.
- That the political economy case for free trade is flawed.

Rodriguez notes that "this is not the first time that someone has come up with a reasonable case for trade protection—indeed ... the literature is filled with this type of argument." But, Rodriguez notes, Unger is less skeptical of state intervention in markets because, unlike many economists, Unger does not view a state's vulnerability to "rent-seeking behaviors" as given, but sees this vulnerability as variable depending on the power of various groups in a society, the nature of bureaucracy, and the openness of the political process.

Rodriguez states that "[w]hile many of the basic ideas proposed by Unger make sense, some of the implications that he draws from them appear problematic." But Rodriguez's final assessment of Free Trade Reimagined is a positive one:

Unger's book is valuable because it puts together a set of ideas—some of them well-known, others new—into a coherent proposal for a different approach to free trade than the one that today finds overwhelming acceptance in policy circles and among academic economists. The fact that some of these ideas had been developed by economists shows that there is not as much distance as could appear between what Unger is claiming and what our profession has found. What is novel is the way in which Unger puts together these distinct observations into a well-thought out case that with practical relevance for the formation of commercial policy and the design of international economic institutions. While economists are familiar with the elements that make up this case, Unger deserves the credit for drawing out their full implications.

Reviewing Free Trade Reimagined for the World Trade Review, Mordechai E. Kreinin praised the book as " a bold attempt to question and restructure the theory of comparative advantage and the idea of free trade that springs from it." However, Kreinin identified what he described as a number of "questionable propositions" in the book. For example, Kreinin concedes that while "it is appropriate to challenge the assumption of the Heckscher–Ohlin (H–O) model, one must admit that … the H–O model does explain many real-world phenomena." Kreinin went on to state that "[m]any of the arguments in the book are well-known propositions that do not necessarily conflict with the idea of free trade." Kreinin took issue with what he characterized as Unger’s obscurity and unsupported rejection of "certain conventional wisdoms." Kreinin concluded that

too much of [Free Trade Reimagined] consists of assertions (rather than testable hypotheses), without even examples to illustrate them. To buttress his arguments, I would suggest adding many real world examples. It is indeed difficult to revolutionize a theory that has been around for many years and change radically a trading system built on it, by writing one book. It certainly can’t be done by simply imagining that an alternative system is superior.

Natalie Chen, reviewing Free Trade Reimagined in the Journal of Regional Science, noted that Unger "seeks to revise and to rethink some of the main assumptions that inspire the debate between free trade and protectionism, and his book achieves this objective in an admirable way." Chen summed up Unger's main message as being "that the debate about free trade cannot be resolved independently of politics." Chen singled out for special praise Unger's argument that "the tasks that require repetition should ... be left to machines, allowing workers to specialize in the other tasks that do not require repetition and thus are the ones that will lead to innovation." As Chen notes, "[t]his point of view is so accurate that it comes to a surprise that it still remains largely overlooked in the literature and in the debate on free trade." Chen concluded: "Overall, [Free Trade Reimagined] is an exceptional contribution, providing an original and innovative perspective to the rethinking of globalization and free trade."
