= Roberto Mangabeira Unger =

Brazilian philosopher and politician

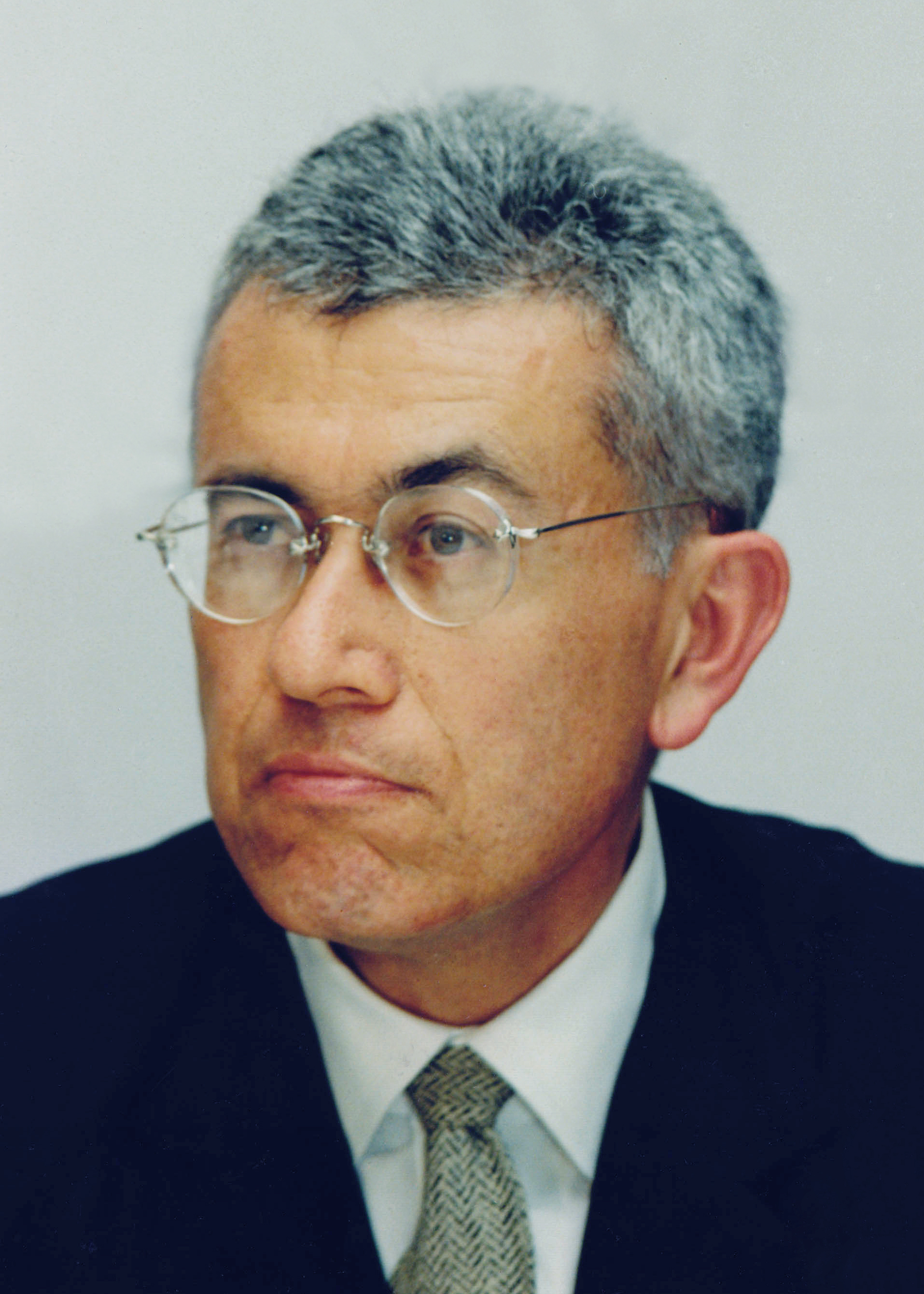
- Born: Rio de Janeiro, Brazil

Education
- Education: Federal University of Rio de Janeiro (BA); Harvard University (LLM, SJD)

Philosophical work
- Era: 20th-/21st-century philosophy
- Region: Western philosophy
- School: Radical pragmatism
- Institutions: Harvard University
- Main interests: Social theory · Legal theory · Economics · Political philosophy · Natural philosophy
- Notable ideas: False necessity · formative context · negative capability · empowered democracy · radical pragmatism · transformative vocation · institutional alternatives

Roberto Mangabeira Unger (/ˈʌŋɡər/; Brazilian Portuguese: [ˈũɡɛʁ]; born March 24, 1947) is a Brazilian philosopher and politician. He is the Roscoe Pound Professor of Law at Harvard Law School. His work is in the tradition of Western philosophy and classical social theory, and is developed across fields in legal theory, philosophy and religion, social and political theory, progressive alternatives, and economics. In natural philosophy he is known for The Singular Universe and the Reality of Time. In social theory he is known for Politics: A Work in Constructive Social Theory. In legal theory he was associated with the Critical Legal Studies movement, which helped disrupt the methodological consensus in American law schools. His political activity helped the transition to democracy in Brazil in the aftermath of the military regime, and culminated with his appointment as Brazil's Minister of Strategic Affairs in 2007 and again in 2015. His work is seen to offer a vision of humanity and a program to empower individuals and change institutions.

At the core of his philosophy is a view of humanity as greater than the contexts in which it is placed. He sees each individual possessed with the capability to rise to a greater life. At the root of his social thought is the conviction that the social world is made and imagined. His work begins from the premise that no natural or necessary social, political, or economic arrangements underlie individual or social activity. Property rights, liberal democracy, wage labor—for Unger, these are all historical artifacts that have no necessary relation to the goals of free and prosperous human activity. For Unger, the market, the state, and human social organization should not be set in predetermined institutional arrangements, but need to be left open to experimentation and revision according to what works for the project of individual and collective empowerment. Doing so, he holds, will enable human liberation.

Unger has long been active in Brazilian opposition politics. He was one of the founding members of the Brazilian Democratic Movement Party and drafted its manifesto. He directed the presidential campaigns of Leonel Brizola and Ciro Gomes, ran for the Chamber of Deputies, and twice launched exploratory bids for the Brazilian presidency. He served as the Minister of Strategic Affairs in the second Luiz Inácio Lula da Silva administration and in the second Dilma administration.

== Biography ==
=== Family ===
Unger's maternal grandfather was Octávio Mangabeira, who served as Brazil's minister of foreign affairs in the late 1920s before the dictatorship of Getúlio Vargas subjected him to a series of imprisonments and exiles in Europe and the United States. After returning to Brazil in 1945, he co-founded a center-left party. He was elected as a representative in the Câmara Federal in 1946, governor of Bahia in 1947, and Senator in 1958.

Both of Unger's parents were intellectuals. His German-born father, Artur Unger, from Dresden, arrived in the United States as a child and later became a U.S. citizen. His mother, Edyla Mangabeira, was a Brazilian poet and journalist. Artur and Edyla met in the US during the exile of Octávio Mangabeira.

=== Early life ===
Roberto Mangabeira Unger was born in Rio de Janeiro and spent his childhood on Manhattan's Upper East Side. He attended the private Allen-Stevenson School. When he was eleven, his father died and his mother moved the family back to Brazil. He attended a Jesuit school and went on to law school at the Federal University of Rio de Janeiro.

Unger was admitted to Harvard Law School in September 1969. After receiving his LLM, Unger stayed at Harvard another year on a fellowship, and then entered the doctoral program. At 23 years old, Unger began teaching jurisprudence, among other things, to first year students. In 1976, aged 29, he got SJD and became one of the youngest faculty members to receive tenure from Harvard Law School.

=== Academic career ===
The beginning of Unger's academic career began with the books Knowledge and Politics and Law in Modern Society, published in 1975 and 1976 respectively. These works led to the co-founding of Critical Legal Studies (CLS) with Duncan Kennedy and Morton Horwitz. The movement stirred up controversy in legal schools across America as it challenged standard legal scholarship and made radical proposals for legal education. By the early 1980s, the CLS movement touched off a heated internal debate at Harvard, pitting the CLS scholars against the older, more traditional scholars.

Throughout much of the 1980s, Unger worked on his magnum opus, Politics: A Work in Constructive Social Theory, a three volume work that assessed classical social theory and developed a political, social, and economic alternative. The series is based on the premise of society as an artifact, and rejects the necessity of certain institutional arrangements. Published in 1987, Politics was foremost a critique of contemporary social theory and politics; it developed a theory of structural and ideological change, and gave an alternative account of world history. By first attacking the idea that there is a necessary progression from one set of institutional arrangements to another, e.g. feudalism to capitalism, it then built an anti-necessitarian theory of social change, theorizing the transition from one set of institutional arrangements to another.

Unger devoted much of the following decades to further elaborating on the insights developed in Politics by working out the political and social alternatives. What Should Legal Analysis Become? (Verso, 1996) developed tools to reimagine the organization of social life. Democracy Realized: The Progressive Alternative (Verso, 1998) and What Should the Left Propose? (Verso, 2006) put forth alternative institutional proposals.

=== Intellectual influences ===
Unger's model of philosophical practice is closest to those philosophers who sought to form a view of the whole of reality, and to do so by using and resisting the specialized knowledge of their time. It has been read as a form of pragmatism, but also as an attempt to disengage ideas and experiences that developed in the West under the influence of Christianity from the categories of Greek philosophy. His thought has been called the inverse of Schopenhauer's philosophy, affirming the supreme value of life and the reality and depth of the self and eschewing fecklessness.

== Philosophical work ==
=== Social theory ===
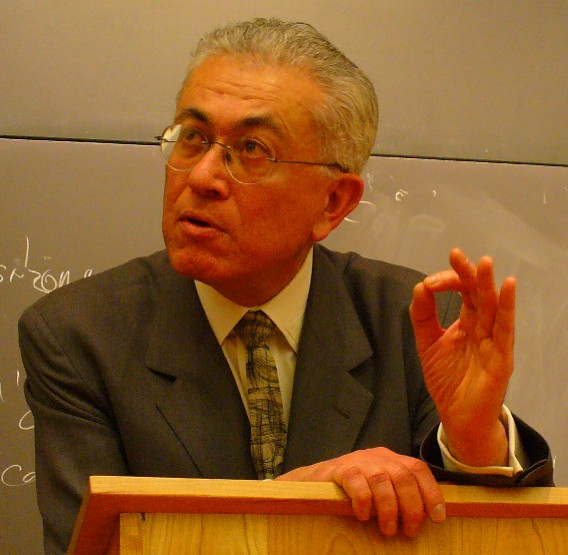
Lecturing in Hauser Hall, Harvard Law School

Unger's social theory is premised on the idea of classical social theory that society is an artifact and can be created and recreated. Whereas previous thinkers such as Hegel or Marx backslid at some point and held onto the notion that there was a necessary institutional or historical social development, Unger, in the words of one critic, seeks to "take the idea to the hilt and produce a theory of emancipation that will escape the limitations of liberal and Marxist theories." That limitation is the search for an ideal structure of society that can be foreseen and centrally planned; whereas the emancipation leads to societies with greater institutional flexibility and variation.

For Unger, society emerges not through compromise or the winnowing down of best options, but rather through conflict and struggle for control of political and material resources. The victors of this struggle come to set the terms of social interaction and transaction, which is then institutionalized through law. This emergent order Unger calls formative context. Under a particular formative context, routines are established and people come to believe and act as if their social words were coherent wholes that are perfectly intelligible and defensible. They come to see the existing arrangements as necessary. Unger calls this false necessity. In reality, these arrangements are arbitrary and hold together rather tenuously, which leaves them open to resistance and change. This opposition Unger calls negative capability.

This leads Unger to the conclusion that change happens piecemeal through struggle and vision, rather than suddenly in revolutionary upheaval with the replacement of one set of institutional arrangements with another. Unger theorizes that cumulative change can alter formative contexts, and he goes on to propose a number of such changes as institutional alternatives to be implemented, which he calls Empowered democracy.

Empowered democracy is Unger's vision of a more open and more plastic set of social institutions through which individuals and groups can interact, propose change, and effectively empower themselves to transform social, economic, and political structures. Unger's strategy in its realization is to combine freedom of commerce and governance at the local level with the ability of political parties at the central government level to promote radical social experiments that would bring about decisive change in social and political institutions.

In practice, the theory would involve radical developments in politics at the center, as well as social innovation in localities. At the center, by bestowing wide-ranging revising powers to those in office, it would give political parties the ability to try out concrete yet profound solutions and proposals. It would turn partisan conflicts over control and uses of governmental power into an opportunity to question and revise the basic arrangements of social life through a rapid resolution of political impasse. In local communities, empowered democracy would make capital and technology available through rotating capital funds, which would encourage entrepreneurship and innovation. Citizens' rights include individual entitlements to economic and civic security, conditional and temporary group claims to portions of social capital, and destabilization rights, which would empower individuals or groups to disrupt organizations and practices marred by routines of subjugation that normal politics have failed to disrupt.

Unger's ideas developed in a context where young intellectuals and radicals attempted to reconcile the conventional theories of society and law being taught in university classrooms with the reality of social protest and revolution of the 1960s and 70s. Disillusioned with Marxism, they turned to thinkers like Levi-Strauss, Gramsci, Habermas, and Foucault in attempt to situate understandings of law and society as a benign science of technocratic policy within a broader system of beliefs that legitimized the prevailing social order. Unlike Habermas, however, who formulates procedures for attaining rational consensus, Unger locates resolution in institutions and their arrangements that remain perpetually open to revision and reconstruction. And, unlike Foucault, who also emphasizes the constructed character of social life, Unger takes this as an opportunity to reimagine institutions and social conditions that will unleash human creativity and enable liberation.

=== Legal thought ===
Unger's work on law has sought to denaturalize the concept of law and how it is represented through particular institutions. He begins by inquiring into why modern societies have legal systems with distinctions between institutions, such as legislature and court, as well as a special caste of lawyers possessing a method of reasoning about social problems. Whereas thinkers such as Marx and Weber had argued that such legal arrangements were a product of economic necessity to secure property rights and the autonomy of the individual, Unger shows that this liberal legal order emerged in Europe as a result of the indeterminate relations between monarchy, aristocracy, and bourgeoisie. It took the particular form that it did by emerging out of the long tradition of natural law and universality, rather than of necessity.

This early work in historical analysis of law and legal thought laid the basis for Unger's contribution to the Critical Legal Studies movement. The movement itself was born in the late 1970s among young legal scholars at Harvard Law School who denounced the theoretical underpinnings of American jurisprudence, legal realism. The participants were committed to shaping society based on a vision of human personality without the hidden interests and class domination of legal institutions. Two tendencies of the movement developed, one, a radical indeterminacy that criticized law as meaning anything we want it to mean, and the other, a neo-Marxist critique that attacked legal thought as an institutional form of capitalism. Unger offered a third tendency, a constructive vision of rethinking rights based on individual emancipation and empowerment, and structural arrangements that would lend themselves to constant revision with the goal of creating more educational and economic opportunities for more people. He laid this out in The Critical Legal Studies Movement, which quickly earned him a following as the philosophical mentor and prophet of the movement.

=== Economic thought ===
At the center of Unger's thought about the economy is the commitment to reimagining and remaking the institutional arrangements of how humans produce and exchange. For Unger, economic institutions have no inherent or natural forms, and he rejects the necessitarian tendencies of classical and neo-classical economists, seeking instead alternatives to the arrangements of contemporary societies. In his writings, he has aimed to revise ideas on the importance of market economies and the division of labor in the workplace and national and global economies.

==== Critique of economics ====
Unger's critique of economics begins with the identification of a key moment in economic history, when the analysis of production and exchange turned away from social theory and engaged in a quest for scientific objectivity. In Unger's analysis, classical economics focused on the causal relations among social activities, which were connected with the production and distribution of wealth. Classical economists asked questions about the true basis of value, activities that contributed to national wealth, systems of rights, or about the forms of government under which people grow rich. In the late-nineteenth century, in response to attacks from socialist ideas and debates about how society works, and as a means to escape the conundrums of value theory and to answer how values could become prices, marginalist economics arose. This movement in economics disengaged economics from prescriptive and normative commitments to withdraw the study of economies from debates about how society worked and what kind of society we wanted to live in. For Unger, this moment in the history of economics robbed it of any analytical or practical value.

Unger's critique of Marginalism begins with Walras' equilibrium theory, which attempted to achieve a certainty of economic analysis by putting aside normative controversies of social organization. Unger finds three weaknesses that crippled the theory: foremost, the theory claimed that equilibrium would be spontaneously generated in a market economy. In reality, a self-adjusting equilibrium fails to occur. Second, the theory puts forth a determinate image of the market. Historically, however, the market has been shown to be indeterminate with different market arrangements. Third, the polemical use of efficiency fails to account for the differences of distribution among individuals, classes, and generations.

The consequences of the marginalist movement were profound for the study of economics, Unger says. The most immediate problem is that under this generalizing tendency of economics, there is no means by which to incorporate empirical evidence and thus to re-imagine the world and develop new theories and new directions. In this way, the discipline is always self-referential and theoretical. Furthermore, the lack of a normative view of the world curtails the ability to propose anything more than a policy prescription, which by definition always assumes a given context. The discipline can only rationalize the world and support a status quo. Lastly, Unger finds that this turn in economics ended up universalizing debates in macroeconomics and leaving the discipline without any historical perspective. A consequence, for example, was that Keynes' solution to a particular historical crisis was turned into a general theory when it should only be understood as a response to a particular situation.

==== Reorientating economics ====
Unger's vision of economics is that it cannot be unhinged from ideas about the individual and social life. Human activity and political organization must be incorporated into any analysis of trade and economies. In remaking the discipline, he calls for a return to the normative practice of classical economics but stripped of its necessitarian assumptions and typological references. The development of explanatory claims and prescriptive ideas are necessary. The discipline must connect the transformation of nature with that of society—the making of things with the reorganization of people.

In Free Trade Reimagined: The World Division of Labor and the Method of Economics, he sets forth six ideas to begin thinking about economic activity.

1. The problem of specialization and discovery. Competition comes to inhibit self transformation when trading partners are unequal but not radically unequal, for both are forced into cost cutting rather than innovating and increasing efficiency.
2. The problem of politics over economics. The making and implementation of policy is not one of discovery, but rather of top down implementation. Rigid state control will limit how a society can respond to tensions and crisis, and thus politics creates its own presuppositions and limits creativity and alternative solutions.
3. Free trade should strengthen the capacity for self transformation by organizing the trading regime in a way that strengthens the capacity of trading partners to experiment and innovate. It becomes question not of how much free trade, but what kind. The best arrangements are those that impose the least amount of restraint.
4. Alternative free trade. The market has no necessary and natural form. If the market economy can be organized in a different way then so can a universal order of free trade among market economies.
5. The division of labor remade. The pin factory organization of labor describes the organization of work as if labor were a machine. But we can make machines to do this work. We should then innovate in those areas where we don't yet know how to make the machine to do the work. Production should be one of collective learning and permanent innovation.
6. Mind against context. The mind is both a machine and an anti-machine; it is both formulaic and totalizing. Thus we never rest in any context, and we need to have arrangements that constantly lend themselves to reinvention.

==== Reconstructing economic institutions ====
For Unger, the economy is not only a device for wealth but also permanent innovation and discovery. It should allow the greatest freedom of the recombination of people and resources, and allow people to innovate in institutional settings. The market economy should not be single dogmatic version of itself.

Unger has presented a number of general institutional proposals that aim to restructure the world trade regime and introduce new alternatives in the market economy. For international and global trade, Unger calls for the need to experiment with different property rights regimes, where multiple forms will coexist in the same market system and not be tied to individual property rights and contractual labor. Generally, rather than maximizing the free trade as the goal, Unger sees the need to build and open the world economy in way that reconciles global openness with national and regional diversification, deviation, heresy, and experiment, where the idea is to support alternatives by making the world safer for them. For national economies, he rejects the need to require the free flow of capital, for there are times when it may be necessary to restrict capital flows. Rather, he puts the emphasis on the free flow of people. Labor should be allowed to move freely throughout the world.

==== "Illusions of necessity in the economic order" ====
Unger's first writing on economic theory was the article "Illusions of necessity in the economic order" in the May 1978 issue of American Economic Review. In the article he makes a case for the need of contemporary economic thought to imitate classical political economy in which theories of exchange should be incorporated into theories of power and perception.

The article articulates the problem of the American economy as one of the inability to realize democracy of production and community in the workplace. This failure, according to Unger, is the result of the lack of a comprehensive program that encompasses production, society, and state, so that immediate attempts to address inequality get swallowed up and appropriated by the status quo in the course of winning immediate gains for the organization or constituency, e.g. unions.

To realize a democracy in the workplace and the abolition of wealth and poverty, Unger argues for the need to relate the program of worker community and democracy with an enlargement of democracy at the national level—the goal cannot be only one of economic production and worker's rights, but must be accompanied by a national project at the structural level. He pushes this idea further by calling not just for a restructuring of the relationship between the firm and state based on private property, but that it also has to be replaced with a new set of rights encompassing access to jobs, markets, and capital. Only as private rights are phased out can rights of decentralized decision making and market exchange be extended to workers. This needs to be accompanied by limits on the size of enterprise and how profits are used to control others' labor.

Neoclassical economics is not up to this task because it begins with preconceived standards that it applies to explain empirical data, while leaving out that which is a theoretical anomaly; there is no causal basis of analysis, Unger says, rather everything is embedded in a timeless universal without any account for context. Furthermore, the ambiguity of concepts of maximization, efficiency, and rationalization pin the analysis to a certain notion of the behavior of the rationalizing individual, making the analysis either tautological or reduced to a set of power relations translated into the language of material exchange.

=== Programmatic thought ===
Key in Unger's thinking is the need to re-imagine social institutions before attempting to revise them. This calls for a program, or programmatic thought. In building this program, however, we must not entertain complete revolutionary overhaul, lest we be plagued by three false assumptions:

- Typological fallacy: the fallacy that there is closed list of institutional alternatives in history, such as "feudalism" or "capitalism". There is not a natural form of society, only the specific result of the piecemeal institutional changes, political movements, and cultural reforms (as well as the accidents and coincidences of history) that came before it.
- Indivisibility fallacy: most subscribers to revolutionary Leftism wrongly believe that institutional structures must stand and fall together. However, structures can be reformed piecemeal.
- Determinism fallacy: the fallacy that uncontrollable and little understood law-like forces drive the historical succession of institutional systems. However, there is no natural flow of history. We make ourselves and our world, and can do so in any way we choose.

To think about social transformation programmatically, one must first mark the direction one wants society to move in, and then identify the first steps with which we can move in that direction. In this way we can formulate proposals at points along the trajectory, be they relatively close to how things are now or relatively far away. This provides a third way between revolution and reform. It is revolutionary reform, where one has a revolutionary vision, but acts on that vision in a sequence of piecemeal reforms. As Unger puts it, transformative politics is "not about blueprints; it is about pathways. It is not architecture; it is music".

==== The two Lefts ====
Unger sees two main Lefts in the world today, a recalcitrant Left and a humanizing Left. The recalcitrant Left seeks to slow down the march of markets and globalization, and to return to a time of greater government involvement and stronger social programs. The humanizing Left (or 'reformist Left') accepts the world in its present form, taking the market economy and globalization as unavoidable, and attempts to humanize their effects through tax-and-transfer policies.

Unger finds the two major orientations of contemporary Leftism inadequate and calls for a 'Reconstructive Left' – one which would insist on redirecting the course of globalization by reorganizing the market economy. In his two books The Left Alternative and The Future of American Progressivism, Unger lays out a program to democratize the market economy and deepen democracy. This Reconstructive Left would look beyond debates on the appropriate size of government, and instead re-envision the relationship between government and firms in the market economy by experimenting with the coexistence of different regimes of private and social property.

It would be committed to social solidarity, but "would refuse to allow our moral interests in social cohesion [to] rest solely upon money transfers commanded by the state in the form of compensatory and retrospective redistribution", as is the case with federal entitlement programs. Instead, Unger's Reconstructive Left affirms "the principle that everyone should share, in some way and at some time, responsibility for taking care of other people."

==== The Left Alternative program ====
Unger has laid out concrete policy proposals in areas of economic development, education, civil society, and political democracy.

- On economic development, Unger has noted that there are only two models for a national economy available to us today: the US model of business control of government, and the northeast Asian model of top down bureaucratic control of the economy. Citing the need for greater imagination on the issue, he has offered a third model that is decentralized, pluralistic, participatory, and experimental. This would take the form of an economy encouraging small business development and innovation that would create large scale self-employment and cooperation. The emphasis is not on the protection of big business as the main sectors of the economy, but the highly mobile and innovative small firm.
- Unger links the development of such an economy to an education system that encourages creativity and empowers the mind, not one that he now sees geared for a reproduction of the family and to put the individual in service of the state. He proposes that such a system should be run locally but have standards enforced through national oversight, as well as a procedure in place to intervene in the case of the failing of local systems.
- Unger's critique of and alternative to social programs goes to the heart of civil society. The problem we are faced with now, he claims, is that we have a bureaucratic system of distribution that provides lower quality service and prohibits the involvement of civil society in the provision of public services. The alternative he lays out is to have the state act to equip civil society to partake in public services and care. This would entail empowering each individual to have two responsibilities, one in the productive economy and one in the caring economy.
- Unger's proposal for political democracy calls for a high energy system that diminishes the dependence of change upon crisis. This can be done, he claims, by breaking the constant threat of stasis and institutionalization of politics and parties through five institutional innovations. First, increase collective engagement through the public financing of campaigns and giving free access to media outlets. Second, hasten the pace of politics by breaking legislative deadlock through the enabling of the party in power to push through proposals and reforms, and for opposition parties to be able to dissolve the government and call for immediate elections. Third, the option of any segment of society to opt out of the political process and to propose alternative solutions for its own governance. Fourth, give the state the power to rescue oppressed groups that are unable to liberate themselves through collective action. Fifth, direct participatory democracy in which active engagement is not purely in terms of financial support and wealth distribution, but through which people are directly involved in their local and national affairs through proposal and action.

=== Theoretical philosophy ===
At the core of Unger's theoretical philosophy are two key conceptions: first the infinity of the individual, and secondly the singularity of the world and the reality of time. The premise behind the infinity of the individual is that we exist within social contexts but we are more than the roles that these contexts may define for us—we can overcome them. In Unger's terms, we are both "context-bound and context-transcending; "we appear as "the embodied spirit;" as "the infinite imprisoned within the finite." For Unger, there is no natural state of the individual and his social being. Rather, we are infinite in spirit and unbound in what we can become. As such, no social institution or convention can contain us. While institutions do exist and shape our beings and our interactions, we can change both their structure and the extent to which they imprison us.

The philosophy of the singularity of the world and the reality of time establishes history as the site of decisive action through the propositions that there is only one real world, not multiple or simultaneous universes, and that time really exists in the world, not as a simulacrum through which we must experience the world.

These two concepts of infinity and reality lie at the heart of Unger's program calling for metaphysical and institutional revolutions. From the concept of the self as infinite but constrained, Unger argues that we must continually transform our environment to better express ourselves. This can only be done in a singular world within which time is real.

==== The self and human nature ====
In Passion: An Essay on Personality, Unger explores the individual and his relation to society from the perspective of the root human predicament of the need to establish oneself as a unique individual in the world but at the same time to find commonality and solidarity with others. This exploration is grounded in what Unger calls a modernist image of the human being as one who lives in context but is not bound by context. Unger's aim is to level a critique, expansion, and defense of modern thinking about the human and society.

==== Religion and the human condition ====
Unger has written and spoken extensively on religion and the human condition.

Religion, Unger argues, is a vision of the world within which we anchor our orientation to life. It is within this orientation that we deal with our greatest terrors and highest hopes. Because we are doomed to die, we hope for eternal life; because we are unable to grasp to totality of existence or of the universe, we try to dispel the mystery and provide a comprehensible explanation; because we have an insatiable desire, we cry for an object that is worthy of this desire, one that is infinite. Humans initially invested religious discourse in nature and the human susceptibility to nature. But as societies evolved and people developed ways to cope with the unpredictability of nature, the emphasis of religion shifted to social existence and its defects. A new moment in religion will begin, Unger argues, when we stop telling ourselves that all will be fine and we begin to face the incorrigible flaws in human existence. The future of religion lies in embracing our mortality and our groundlessness.

Unger sees four flaws in the human condition. They are, our mortality and the facing of imminent death; our groundlessness in that we are unable to grasp the solution to the enigma of existence, see the beginning or end of time, nor put off the discovery of the meaning of life; our insatiability in that we always want more, and demand the infinite from the finite; and our susceptibility to belittlement which places us in a position to constantly confront petty routine forcing us to die many little deaths.

There are three major responses in the history of human thought to these flaws: escape, humanization, and confrontation.

- The overcoming of the world denies the phenomenal world and its distinctions, including the individual. It proclaims a benevolence towards others and an indifference to suffering and change. One achieves serenity by becoming invulnerable to suffering and change. The religion of Buddhism and philosophical thought of Plato and Schopenhauer best represent this orientation.
- The humanization of the world creates meaning out of social interactions in a meaningless world by placing all emphasis on our reciprocal responsibility to one another. Confucianism and contemporary liberalism represent this strand of thought, both of which aim to soften the cruelties of the world.
- The struggle with the world is framed by the idea that series of personal and social transformations can increase our share of attributes associated with the divine and give us a larger life. It emphasizes love over altruism, rejecting the moral of the mastery of self-interest to enhance solidarity, and emphasizing the humility of individual love. This orientation has been articulated in two different voices: the sacred voice of Judaism, Christianity, and Islam, and the profane voice of the secular projects of liberation.

==== The religion of the future ====
The spiritual orientation of the struggle with the world has given rise to the secular movements of emancipation in the modern world, and it is here that Unger sees the religion of the future. The problem Unger sees, however, is that as an established religion, this orientation has betrayed its ideological underpinnings and has made peace with existing order. It has accepted the hierarchies of class structure in society, accepted the transfer of money as serving as the basis of solidarity, and reaffirmed the basis of existing political, economic, and social institutions by investing in a conservative position of their preservation. Thus, "to be faithful to what made this orientation persuasive and powerful in the first place, we must radicalize it against both established institutions and dominant beliefs."

Unger's call is for a revolution in our religious beliefs that encompasses both individual transformation and institutional reorganization; to create change in the life of the individual as well as in the organization of society. The first part of the program of individual transformation means waking from the dazed state in which we live our lives, and recognizing our mortality and groundlessness without turning to the “feel-good theologies and philosophies”. The second part of the program of social transformation means supplementing the metaphysical revolution with institutional practices by creating social institutions that allow us to constantly overthrow our constraints and our context, and to make this overthrow not a one time event but a continuing process. This is the program of empowered democracy that calls for reforms in the market economy, education, politics, and civil society. "The goal is not to humanize society but to divinize humanity." It is "to raise ordinary life to a higher level of intensity and capability."

=== Natural philosophy ===
Unger's philosophy of space and time presented in The Singular Universe and the Reality of Time argues for the singularity of the world and the reality of time. His arguments are grounded in the tradition of natural philosophy. He takes on the Newtonian idea of the independent observer standing outside of time and space, addresses the skepticism of David Hume, rejects the position of Kant, and attacks speculations about parallel universes of contemporary cosmology. At stake is the laying of the foundations for a view of the world and causality that is open to all possibilities; that is not a closed system of options in which our future is governed by deterministic laws and typologies. It is an understanding of society that rejects the naturalness and necessity of current social arrangements; "a form of understanding of society and history that refuses to explain the present arrangements in a manner that vindicates their naturalness and necessity."

The thesis of the singularity of the world states that there is one real world. Such a thesis stands in stark contrast to contemporary theoretical physics and cosmology, which speculate about multiple universes out of the dilemma of how to have law like explanations if the universe is unique—laws will be universal because they don't just apply to this unique universe but to all universes. However, there is no empirical evidence for multiple worlds. Unger's singularity thesis can better address our empirical observations and set the conceptual platform to address the four main puzzles in cosmology today: Big Bang, initial conditions, horizon problem, and the precise value of constants, such as gravity, speed of light, and the Planck constant.

The thesis that time is real states that time "really is real" and everything is subject to history. This move is to historicize everything, even the laws of nature, and to challenge our acting as if time were real but not too real—we act as if it is somewhat real otherwise there would be no causal relations, but not so real that laws change. Unger holds that time is so real that laws of nature are also subject to its force and they too must change. There are no eternal laws upon which change occurs, rather time precedes structure. This position gives the universe a history and makes time non-emergent, global, irreversible, and continuous.

Bringing these two thesis together, Unger theorizes that laws of nature develop together with the phenomenon they explain. Laws and initial conditions co-evolve, in the same that they do in how cells reproduce and mutate in different levels of complexity of organisms. In cosmological terms Unger explains the passing from one structure to another at the origins of the universe when the state of energy was high but not infinite, and the freedom of movement was greater than when operating under a known set of laws. The conditions of the early universe is compatible with the universe that preceded it. The new universe may be different in structure, but has been made with what existed in the old one, e.g. masses of elementary particles, strength of different forces, and cosmological constants. As the universe cools the phenomena and laws work together with materials produced by sequence; they are path dependent materials. They are also constrained by the family of resemblances of the effective laws against the background of the conceptions of alternative states the universe and succession of universes.

==== Mathematics and the one real, time-drenched world ====
One consequence of these positions that Unger points to is the revision of the concept and function of mathematics. If there is only one world drenched in time through and through, then mathematics cannot be a timeless expression of multiple universes that captures reality. Rather, Unger argues that mathematics is a means of analyzing the world removed of time and phenomenal distinction. By emptying the world of time and space it is able to better focus on one aspect of reality: the recurrence of certain ways in which pieces of the world relate to other pieces. Its subject matter are the structured wholes and bundles of relations, which we see outside mathematics only as embodied in the time-bound particulars of the manifest world. In this way, mathematics extends our problem solving powers as an extension of human insight, but it is not a part of the world.

== Political engagement ==
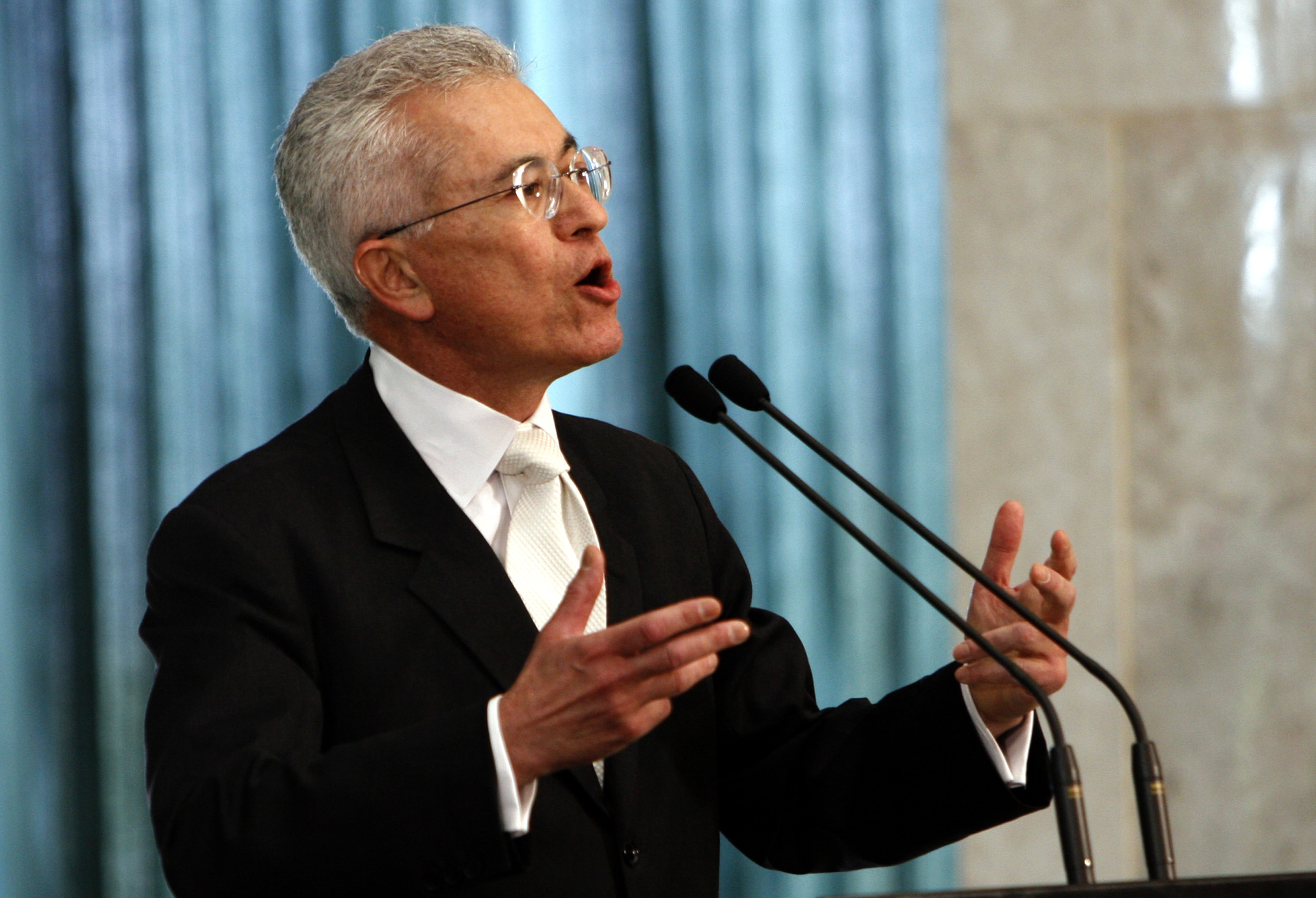
Roberto Mangabeira Unger speaking in Brazil in 2007 as the Minister of Strategic Affairs

Unger has a long history of political activity in Brazil. He worked in early opposition parties in the 1970s/80s against the Brazilian military dictatorship, and drafted the founding manifesto for the Brazilian Democratic Movement Party (PMDB) in 1980. He served as an intimate adviser to two presidential candidates, and launched exploratory bids himself in 2000 and 2006. He was the Secretary for Strategic Affairs in the Lula administration from 2007 to 2009, and is currently working on a number of social and developmental projects in the state of Rondônia.

Driving Unger's political engagement is the idea that society can be made and remade. Unlike Mill or Marx, who posited a particular class as the agent of history, Unger does not see a single vehicle for transformative politics. He advocates world-wide revolution, but does not see this happening as a single cataclysmic event or undertaken by a class agent, like the Communist movement. Rather, he sees the possibility of piecemeal change, where institutions can be replaced one at a time, and permanent plasticity can be built into the institutional infrastructure.

=== Early political activity, 1970s and 1980s ===
Unger's engagement in Brazilian politics began in the late 1970s as Brazil started to democratize. In 1979, he presented himself to the main opposition party, the Brazilian Democratic Movement (MDB), and was appointed chief of staff by party leader Ulysses Guimaraes. His initial work was to develop the positions of the party and draft policy proposals for their party's congressional representatives. When the military regime dissolved the two-party system and established a multi-party system later that year, Unger worked to unite progressive liberals and the independent, non-communist left into the Brazilian Democratic Movement Party (PMDB). As a co-founder of the party, he authored its first manifesto. Unger left the party after the rise of a conservative faction, which was a part of the MDB but had been excluded from the initial formation of the PMDB.

After departing the PMDB in the early 1980s, Unger began looking for political agents who would serve as vehicles for his national alternative. In 1981, he jointed the Democratic Labour Party of Brazil (PDT) led by Leonel Brizola, a former governor of Rio de Janeiro and a figure of the left prior to the dictatorship. Brizola had founded the PDT and Unger saw it as the authentic opposition to the military regime. Throughout the 1980s he worked with Brizola to travel the country recruiting members, and developing policy positions and a political language.

In 1983, Brizola, then serving his second of three terms as governor of Rio de Janeiro, appointed Unger to head the State Foundation for the Education of Minors (FEEM), a state-run foundation for homeless children. During his year-long tenure, he began a process of radical reforms of the institutions, such as opening the door to international adoption and reintegrating children with their families. He also set up community organizations in the slums to help support families in order to prevent the abandonment of children.

=== Political campaigns, 1990s and 2000s ===
In 1990, Unger ran a symbolic campaign for a seat in the national chamber of deputies. He had no money, no structure, and only campaigned for eight weeks. He ran on a platform of reforming the slums, and went around the slum neighborhoods giving lectures. He received 9,000 votes, just 1,000 votes short of winning the seat. None of the votes came from the slums, however. All his votes had come from the middle class, although he had never campaigned in those neighborhoods or to that constituency. Recalling the experience, Unger says "it was kind of absurd... I had no money, no staff, and I would go into these slums, alone, to hand out pamphlets, often to the local drug pushers." It is an experience that Unger cites as leading to his belief that the system and possibilities were much more open than he had previously imagined.

Unger served as Brizola's campaign organizer and primary political adviser in his bids for the Brazilian Presidency in 1989 and 1994. In 1989, Brizola finished in third place, losing the second position, which would have qualified him for a runoff against Fernando Collor de Mello, by a very narrow margin to Luiz Inácio Lula da Silva. Brizola and Unger both supported Lula in the second round of the election, but Collor would go on to beat Lula and win the Presidency.

Unger also helped organize the presidential bids of former finance minister and governor of Ceará, Ciro Gomes, in 1998 and 2002. In 1998, Gomes came in third place with 11% of the vote, and in 2002 he came in fourth place with 12% of the vote. Unger had written The Next Step: An Alternative to Neoliberalism with Gomes in 1996. At the national level in 2002, again in the second round of the election, Unger supported Lula who went on to defeat José Serra to win the Presidency.

With the experience of supporting others who imploded politically, Unger discovered that, as he put it, he was committing "the classic mistake of the philosophers in politics, which is to try to find someone else to do the work." In 2000, he ran in the primaries for the mayor of São Paulo, but the PPS party leader suspended the primaries when it became clear that Unger would win the nomination and challenge party control. He launched an exploratory bid for the 2006 presidential election on the PRB ticket, but the party decided not to put forth its own candidate for the presidency and to support Lula of the PT.

=== As Minister of Strategic Affairs in the Lula administration ===
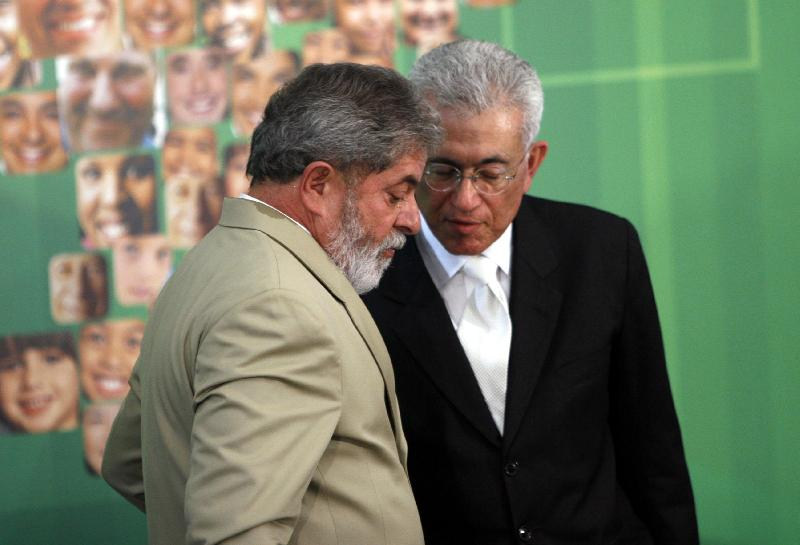
Minister Unger speaking to President Lula in 2007.

Unger found President Lula's first term to be conservative and riddled with scandal. He wrote articles calling Lula's administration "the most corrupt of Brazil's history" and called for his impeachment.

Despite the criticism, many advisers to Lula insisted that he should invite Unger to join his administration. In June 2007, after winning his second term, Lula appointed Unger as head of the newly established Long-term Planning Secretariat (a post that would eventually be called The Minister of Strategic Affairs).

Unger's work in office was an attempt to enact his program. Seeing the future in small enterprises and advocating a rotating capital fund that would function like a government run venture capital fund, he pushed for a rapid expansion of credit to smaller producers and a decentralized network of technical support centers that would help broaden the middle class from below. He further called for political solutions that would broaden access to production forces such as information technology, and for states to focus on equipping and monitoring civil society rather than trying to provide social services.

Unger's specific projects while in office were focused on giving "ordinary men and women the instruments with which to render this vitality fertile and productive." He aimed to use state powers and resources to allow the majority of poor workers to "follow the path of the emergent vanguard". He developed a series of sectoral and regional initiatives that would prefigure the model of development based on the broadening of economic and educational opportunity by democratizing the market economy and restructuring civil society.

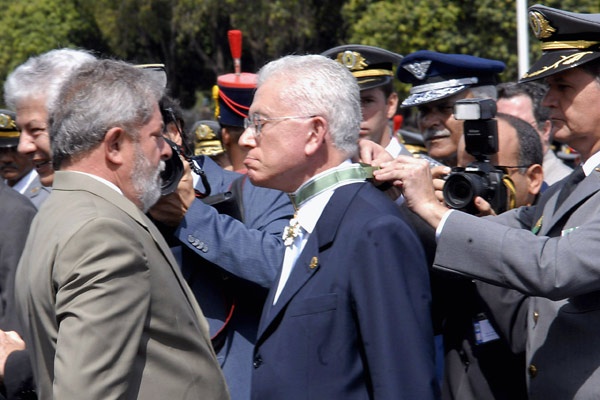
Unger receiving a medal of honor on Army Day 2008 from President Lula for his work in formulating Brazil's National Defense Strategy.

Sectorally, Unger revamped the educational structure and rewrote labor laws. In education, he implemented a model of secondary education, where analytical problem-solving education was paired with technical education that focused on conceptual capabilities rather than job-specific skills. There are several hundred of these institutions today. He further drafted legislation to associate national, state and local jurisdictions into common bodies that could intervene when a local school system fell below the minimum acceptable threshold of quality and "fix it the way an independent administrator would fix a failing business under Chapter 11 bankruptcy." In labor, Unger worked with unions to write new labor laws designed to protect and organize temporary workers, subcontractors, and those working in the informal economy.

Regionally, some of Unger's most influential work was the implementation of a developmental strategy for the Amazon that would be sustainable environmentally by making it socially inclusive. He drafted and passed legislation to regularize small-scale squatters on untitled land by giving them clear legal titles, which would create self-interest in preservation while granting them economic opportunity. Included in this law were protections against large scale land grabbers. Such legislation aimed to empower locals living on Amazonian land by giving them ownership rights and linking their interest in preserving it, rather than pillaging it as quickly as possible in the face of ambiguous ownership rights. This legislation passed and was put into law.

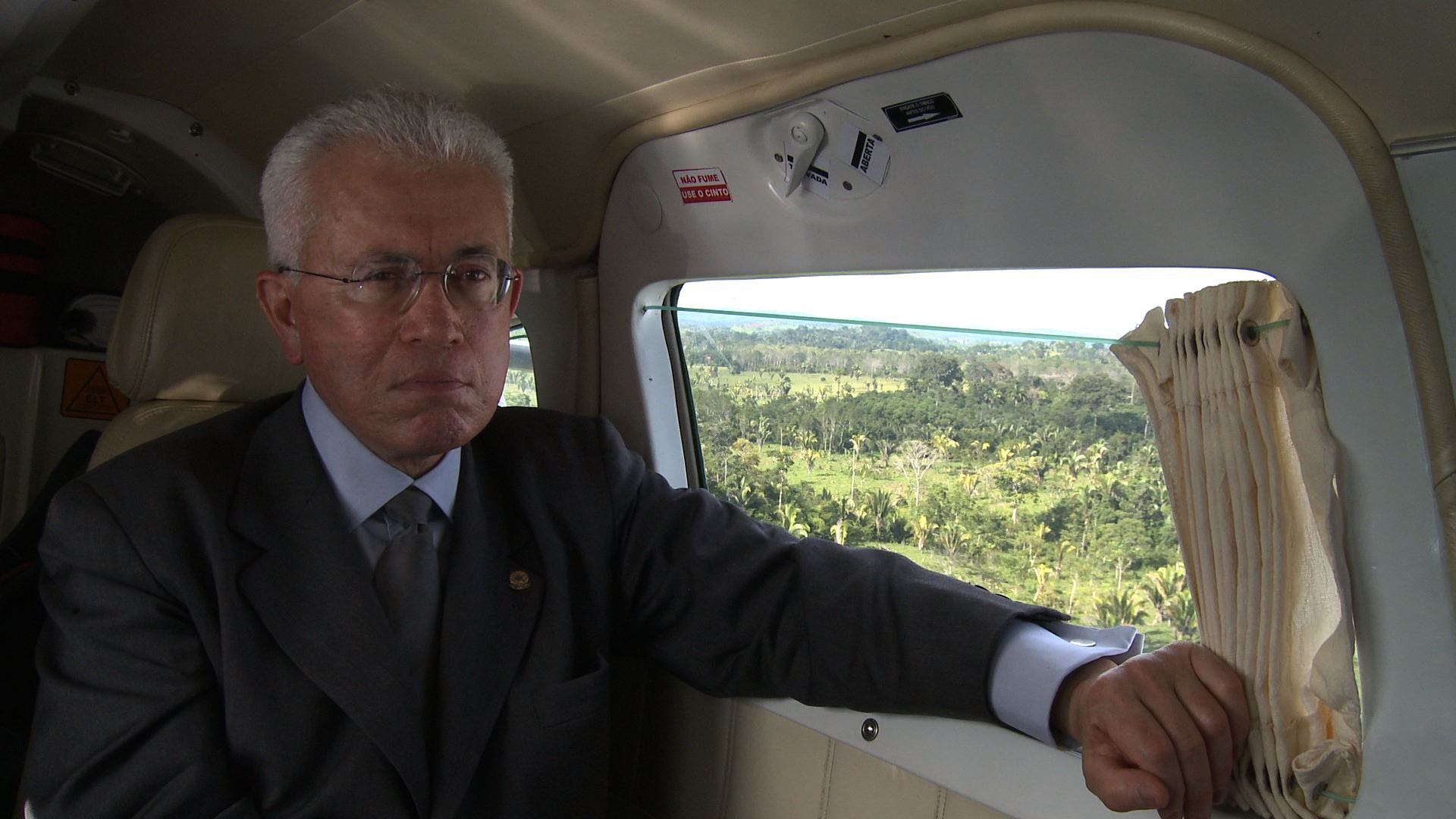
Unger touring the Amazon via small aircraft

Unger served in the administration for two years. On 26 June 2009, President Lula announced Unger would be leaving the government and returning to Harvard University. He later cited personal and political reasons for his early departure.

=== Engagement outside Brazil ===
Unger's attempts to develop global social, political, and economic alternatives have led him in episodic engagements in national debates around the world. His approach in these engagements recognizes that the problems facing contemporary societies are not distinct from nation to nation, and that general structural arrangements can first be implemented, which will allow for local innovation, flexibility, and development in social, economic, and political arenas. There is no institutional blueprint for Unger, however, only a direction that can be pointed to and general proposals that can be implemented to allow further institutional innovation and experimentation. Unger's guiding principle is that institutional flexibility needs to be built into the implemented system, and in this way a diversity of local experiments would take hold the world over.

One of Unger's more promising engagements was the Latin American Alternative in the late 1990s. Unger and Mexican politician and political scientist Jorge Castañeda Gutman assembled an informal network of politicians and business leaders dedicated to redrawing the political map. The aim of the group was to provide a critique of neoliberalism coupled with a way forward in a distinct strategy and institutional model of development. They floated proposals such as guaranteeing every citizen "social rights" (e.g. education and a job), breaking up media oligopolies, and holding town meetings to help citizens supervise municipal spending. The group held a number of meetings over the years, which included Brazilian finance minister Ciro Gomes, Chilean senator Carlos Ominami, Argentinian politicians Dante Caputo and Rodolfo Terragno, and Mexican politician and future president Vicente Fox. The meetings resulted in a document entitled the "Buenos Aires Consensus" in 1997, which Castaneda called "the end of neoliberalism; of the Washington Consensus".

This consensus was formally signed in 2003 by Argentinian President Néstor Kirchner and Brazilian President Lula da Silva. Other Latin American leaders who signed it included Fox, future president of Chile Ricardo Lagos, Mexican politician Cuauhtémoc Cárdenas, former vice president of Nicaragua Sergio Ramírez, future president of Argentina Fernando de la Rúa, and former Brazilian president Itamar Franco.

During the 2008 US presidential campaign, Unger was in frequent contact with candidate Barack Obama via email and Blackberry. He has since become critical of the Obama administration, and called for the defeat of Obama in the 2012 election as a first step to remaking the Democratic party.

=== Current engagement ===
Unger's recent political work has focused on the north-western Brazilian state of Rondônia. He sees the human and natural resources of the state meeting all the conditions to serve as the vanguard of a new model of development for Brazil. Speaking to News Rondônia he said, "Rondônia is a state formed by a multitude of small and medium entrepreneurs together with the Brazilian government, and that is something truly unique in our country."

He has been traveling the state giving public lectures and encouraging political discourse and engagement in localities. Working with governor João Aparecido Cahulla on development projects, Unger has outlined a series of important areas of focus. The first is to change the agricultural model from one of intensive farming to an industrialization of produces through the recuperation of degraded pastures, supply fertilizers and lime, and diversifying crops and livestock farming. The second key project is transforming education from rote learning to creative thinking and engagement. He helped open the School Teixeira in Porto Velho. Another ongoing project is the construction of a new educational center in accordance with his theory of pedagogical reform, where delinquents would be reintegrated into municipal life.

== Circumstance and influence ==
Unger's philosophical work grapples with some of the most fundamental and enduring problems of human existence. It has been put into direct dialogue with Kant's moral law, and said to have provided one answer to Hume's Guillotine. Unger's analysis of liberalism and the philosophical program he builds around rethinking the individual has also inspired new thinking and approaches to psychiatry.

In 1987, the Northwestern University Law Review devoted an issue to Unger's work, analysing his three-volume publication Politics: A Work in Constructive Social Theory. Michael J. Perry, a professor of law at Northwestern University, praises Unger for producing a vast work of social theory that combines law, history, politics, and philosophy within a single narrative.

Early reviewers of Politics questioned Unger's seeming predicament of criticizing a system of thought and its historical tradition without subjecting himself to the same critical gaze. "There is little acknowledgement that he himself is writing in a particular socio-historical context", wrote one reviewer, and another asked, "in what context Unger himself is situated and why that context itself is not offered up to the sledgehammer."

Critics also balked at the lack of example or concrete vision of his social and political proposals. As one critic wrote, "it is difficult to imagine what Unger's argument would mean in practice", and that "he does not tell us what to make." Others have suggested that the lack of imagination of such readers is precisely what is at stake.

== Books ==
- Knowledge and Politics, Free Press, 1975.
- Law In Modern Society: Toward a Criticism of Social Theory, Free Press, 1976.
- Passion: An Essay on Personality, Free Press, 1986.
- The Critical Legal Studies Movement, Harvard University Press, 1986.
- Politics: A Work in Constructive Social Theory, Cambridge University Press, 1987, in 3 Vols:
  - Vol 1 – False Necessity: Anti-Necessitarian Social Theory in the Service of Radical Democracy.
  - Vol 2 – Social Theory: Its Situation and Its Task - A Critical Introduction to Politics: A Work in Constructive Social Theory.
  - Vol 3 – Plasticity Into Power: Comparative-Historical Studies on the Institutional Conditions of Economic and Military Success.
- What Should Legal Analysis Become?, Verso, 1996
- Politics: The Central Texts, Theory Against Fate, Verso, 1997, with Cui Zhiyuan.
- Democracy Realized: The Progressive Alternative, Verso, 1998.
- The Future of American Progressivism: An Initiative for Political and Economic Reform, Beacon, 1998 - with Cornel West
- What Should the Left Propose?, Verso, 2006.
- The Self Awakened: Pragmatism Unbound, Harvard, 2007.
- Free Trade Reimagined: The World Division of Labor and the Method of Economics, Princeton University Press, 2007.
- The Left Alternative, Verso, 2009 (2nd edition to What Should the Left Propose?, Verso, 2006.).
- The Religion of the Future, Harvard, 2014.
- The Singular Universe and the Reality of Time, Cambridge University Press, 2014, with Lee Smolin.
- The Knowledge Economy, Verso, 2019.
- Governing the World Without World Government , Verso, 2022.
- The World and Us, Verso, 2024.

== See also ==
- Empowered democracy
- False necessity
- Formative context
- Negative capability
- Passions
- Structure and agency
