= Democracy Realized =

1998 book by Roberto Mangabeira Unger

Democracy Realized: The Progressive Alternative
- Author: Roberto Mangabeira Unger
- Language: English
- Genre: Political theory
- Published: 1998 (Verso)
- Publication place: United States
- Pages: 309
- ISBN: 978-1-85984-983-5
- LC Class: JC423.U49 1998
- Preceded by: What Should Legal Analysis Become?
- Followed by: The Future of American Progressivism: An Initiative for Political and Economic Reform

Democracy Realized: The Progressive Alternative is a 1998 book by philosopher and politician Roberto Mangabeira Unger. In the book, Unger sets forth a program of "democratic experimentalism" that challenges and defies the neoliberal consensus that there are few alternatives for the progressive reform of democratic and market structures.

== Overview ==
In Democracy Realized, Unger describes the change in the locus of worldwide ideological conflict since the collapse of communism from the old conflict between statism and privatism, to the new ideological conflict about alternative forms of economic, social, and political organization. Unger notes the persistent difficulty in formulating credible alternatives to the neoliberal program in this setting. In the book, he presents a program for overcoming these difficulties through a practice he describes as “democratic experimentalism.”

At the heart of Unger's productivist program is his explanation of the difference, in business firms, between vanguard production and rearguard production. He contends that the practices of vanguardist production, which include continuous education, a softened contrast between task-defining and task-executing activities, a culture of cooperation between vanguardist firms, and a practice of permanent experiment, already exist in relatively isolated segments of the economy that have greater links to each other, across national borders, than they do to the rearguard economies of their own countries. The vanguardist practices modeled by these firms and industries, Unger argues, are key to productive progress in the contemporary world, and should be extended beyond the productive vanguard to all areas of society, with the assistance of a government reconfigured along democratic experimentalist lines. Unger sets forth the changes he envisions in government, including mechanisms to break impasse between components of government, provisions to heighten political mobilization, expanded and democratized access to capital, a higher social savings rate, significant resources devoted to social endowment, and a central role to an emancipatory school that would train children, as little prophets, to become an informed, creative, and mobilized citizenry of the empowered democracy that Unger envisions.

Unger concludes the book with a manifesto consisting of thirteen theses that sum up the principles of democratic experimentalism.

== Reception ==
Anthony Barnett, reviewing Democracy Realized in the Times Literary Supplement, praised the book highly:

A short, exceptionally sustained argument .... Here [Unger] is in top form, as he advocates the need for democracy. He is neither earnest nor predictable. ... Unger's arguments really are different from both sides of the familiar Lefts and Rights. His is an anti-Marxist, anti-Keynesian critique of neoliberalism ... In the course of it, he combines high theory with striking comparisons of Indian, American and Brazilian democracy.

Ruth Levitas, writing in the journal Critical Horizons, considered Democracy Realized alongside Richard Rorty's book Achieving Our Country. Levitas described Democracy Realized as a

summary statement of Unger's hopes for a gradual move from the global status quo to a world that is more democratic and more economically just, through a process he describes as democratic experimentalism. Here Unger's arguments are pitched in terms of the institutional structures of society, and a process of change of those economic, social and political structures and processes through step-by-step improvisation and collective learning."

Levitas concluded her review of Unger's work by stating that Unger's argument is marked by a "cautious but deeply optimistic openness." Levitas suggests that although Unger "reject[s] the terminology of utopia," he "may actually be utopian in the best sense of the word."

Michael Rustin, writing in the New Left Review, noted that Unger's work first came to prominence before the collapse of Communist regimes around the world, and remarked that Democracy Realized shows "how Unger's thought weathered the upheavals of the past decades..." Unger, Rustin concludes, is "defiantly committed to finding a radical alternative in the spirit of a new left .... As a global democratic movement against neoliberalism seems to be growing ... his moment as an inspirational social theorist may be about to arrive."

Fred Block reviewed Democracy Realized for Contemporary Sociology. Block described Democracy Realized as "Unger's effort to make his political vision accessible to readers who lack his erudition and theoretical sophistication." Block praised Democracy Realized, writing,

For those who find current discussions of the "Third Way" lacking in both political and intellectual nourishment, Unger's book provides a veritable feast of ideas. His critiques of both social democracy and existing institutional arrangements are often eloquent and original, and the political program strikes the correct balance between radical aspirations and the imperatives of actual politics.

== See also ==
- Empowered democracy

== Sources ==
- Barnett, Anthony (March 2000). "Creative Utopia (review of Democracy Realized)". The Times Literary Supplement. p. 13.
- Block, Fred (November 2000). "Democracy Realized (review)". Contemporary Sociology. 29 (6). American Sociological Association: 855–856. doi:10.2307/2654119. JSTOR 2654119.
- Levitas, Ruth (April 2008). "Pragmatism, utopia and anti-utopia". Critical Horizons. 9 (1). Maney Online: 42–59. doi:10.1558/crit.v9i1.42. S2CID 144761406.
- Rustin, Michael (March–April 2004). "A practical utopianism? (review)". New Left Review. II (26). New Left Review: 136.
- Unger, Roberto Mangabeira (1998). Democracy Realized: The Progressive Alternative. New York: Verso.
