= Negative capability =

Poetic concept

Negative capability is the capacity of artists to pursue ideals of beauty, perfection and sublimity even when it leads them into intellectual confusion and uncertainty, as opposed to a preference for philosophical certainty over artistic beauty. The term, first used by John Keats in 1817, has been subsequently used by poets, philosophers and literary theorists to describe the ability to perceive and recognize truths beyond the reach of what Keats called "consecutive reasoning".

== Use by Keats ==
John Keats used the phrase only briefly in a private letter to his brothers George and Thomas on 22 December 1817, and it became known only after his correspondence was collected and published. Keats described a conversation he had been engaged in a few days previously:

I had not a dispute but a disquisition with Dilke, upon various subjects; several things dove-tailed in my mind, and at once it struck me what quality went to form a Man of Achievement, especially in Literature, and which Shakespeare possessed so enormously—I mean Negative Capability, that is, when a man is capable of being in uncertainties, mysteries, doubts, without any irritable reaching after fact and reason—Coleridge, for instance, would let go by a fine isolated verisimilitude caught from the Penetralium of mystery, from being incapable of remaining content with half-knowledge. This pursued through volumes would perhaps take us no further than this, that with a great poet the sense of Beauty overcomes every other consideration, or rather obliterates all consideration.

Samuel Taylor Coleridge was, by 1817, a frequent target of criticism by the younger poets of Keats's generation, often ridiculed for his infatuation with German idealistic philosophy. Against Coleridge's obsession with philosophical truth, Keats sets up the model of Shakespeare, whose poetry articulated various points of view and never advocated a particular vision of truth.

Keats' ideas here, as was usually the case in his letters, were expressed tersely with no effort to fully expound what he meant, but passages from other letters enlarge on the same theme. In a letter to J.H. Reynolds in February 1818, he wrote:

We hate poetry that has a palpable design upon us—and if we do not agree, seems to put its hand in its breeches pocket. Poetry should be great & unobtrusive, a thing which enters into one's soul, and does not startle it or amaze it with itself but with its subject.

In another letter to Reynolds the following May, he contrived the metaphor of 'the chamber of maiden thought' and the notion of the 'burden of mystery', which together express much the same idea as that of negative capability:

I compare human life to a large Mansion of Many Apartments, two of which I can only describe, the doors of the rest being as yet shut upon me—The first we step into we call the infant or thoughtless Chamber, in which we remain as long as we do not think—We remain there a long while, and notwithstanding the doors of the second Chamber remain wide open, showing a bright appearance, we care not to hasten to it; but are at length imperceptibly impelled by the awakening of the thinking principle—within us—we no sooner get into the second Chamber, which I shall call the Chamber of Maiden-Thought, than we become intoxicated with the light and the atmosphere, we see nothing but pleasant wonders, and think of delaying there for ever in delight: However among the effects [which] this breathing is father of is that tremendous one of sharpening one's vision into the heart and nature of Man—of convincing ones nerves that the World is full of Misery and Heartbreak, Pain, Sickness, and oppression—whereby This Chamber of Maiden Thought becomes gradually darken'd and at the same time on all sides of it many doors are set open—but all dark—all leading to dark passages—We see not the balance of good and evil. We are in a Mist—We are now in that state—We feel the 'burden of the Mystery,' To this point was Wordsworth come, as far as I can conceive when he wrote 'Tintern Abbey' and it seems to me that his Genius is explorative of those dark Passages. Now if we live, and go on thinking, we too shall explore them. he is a Genius and superior to us, in so far as he can, more than we, make discoveries, and shed a light in them—Here I must think Wordsworth is deeper than Milton[.]

Keats understood Coleridge as searching for a single, higher-order truth or solution to the mysteries of the natural world. He went on to find the same fault in Dilke and Wordsworth. All these poets, he claimed, lacked objectivity and universality in their view of the human condition and the natural world. In each case, Keats found a mind which was a narrow private path, not a "thoroughfare for all thoughts". Lacking for Keats were the central and indispensable qualities requisite for flexibility and openness to the world, or what he referred to as negative capability.

This concept of negative capability is precisely a rejection of set philosophies and preconceived systems of nature. He demanded that the poet be receptive rather than searching for fact or reason, and to not seek absolute knowledge of every truth, mystery, or doubt.

Keats' concept of negative capability can be understood as an author's ability to enter fully and imaginatively into the characters, objects, and actions he represents. In his essay "Tradition and the Individual Talent," T. S. Eliot wrote, "the progress of an artist is a continual self-sacrifice, a continual extinction of personality." According to this line of interpretation, the author negates himself, in order to present a fully independent character, one with all the uncertainty and mutability of a real person. Brian Vickers comments, "By 'negative capability', Keats probably meant Shakespeare's ability to imagine himself in each dramatic scene, to efface himself, and to enter with complete sympathy into the passions and moods of his characters"

== Use of the word 'negative' ==
Negative capability can be difficult to grasp, as it is not a name for a thing but rather a way of feeling or of knowing. In the same way that chameleons are 'negative' for colour, according to Keats, poets are negative for self and identity: they change their identity with each subject they inhabit. The intuitive knowing of the inner life of, for example, a nightingale or a Grecian urn, could not be grasped as a concept, and would be known through actual living experience of one's everyday changeable being.

Another explanation of the word negative relies on hypothesising that Keats was influenced in his studies of medicine and chemistry, and that it refers to the negative pole of an electric current which is passive and receptive. In the same way that the negative pole receives the current from the positive pole, the poet receives impulses from a world that is full of mystery and doubt, which cannot be explained but which the poet can translate into art.

== Prepoetry ==
Negative capability could also be understood as just one of a number of moods competing in the poet's mind before a poem arrives, i.e. during the phase that may be called "prepoetry", after the musical form of the same name which delights in 'uncertainties, mysteries, [and] doubts'. At one point Coleridge thought of the poet as Truth's Ventriloquist. One way to approach the subject could be through the words of poets themselves, e.g.:

"Emotion recollected in tranquility" and "wise passivity" (e.g. Wordsworth), "the systematic derangement of the senses" (e.g. Rimbaud), "Automatic writing and thought transference" (e.g. Yeats), and "Frenzy" (e.g. Shakespeare).

The poet's eye, in fine frenzy rolling,
Doth glance from heaven to earth, from earth to heaven;
And as imagination bodies forth
forms of things unknown, the poet's pen
Turns them to shapes and gives to airy nothing
A local habitation and a name.

— A Midsummer Night's Dream, Act V scene 1, from line 1841

== Reception ==
=== Roberto Mangabeira Unger ===
In 2004, Brazilian philosopher Roberto Mangabeira Unger appropriated Keats' term in order to explain resistance to rigid social divisions and hierarchies where negative capability was the denial of whatever delivered over to a fixed scheme of division and hierarchy and to an enforced choice between routine and rebellion. Negative capability could empower against social and institutional constraints, and loosen the bonds entrapping people in a certain social station.

Unger claimed an example of negative capability could be seen in industrial innovation, when modern industrialist could not just become more efficient with surplus extraction based on pre-existing work roles, but needed to invent new styles of flexible labor, expertise, and capital management, by inventing new restraints upon labor, such as length of the work day and division of tasks. Unger claimed industrialists and managers who were able to break old forms of organizational arrangements exercised negative capability.

Negative capability is a key component in Unger's theory of false necessity and formative context. The theory of false necessity claims that social worlds are the artifact of human endeavors. In order to explain how people move from one formative context to another without the conventional social theory constraints of historical necessity (e.g. feudalism to capitalism), and to do so while remaining true to the key insight of individual human empowerment and anti-necessitarian social thought, Unger recognized an infinite number of ways of resisting social and institutional constraints, which could lead to an infinite number of outcomes. This variety of forms of resistance and empowerment (i.e. negative capability) would make change possible.

According to Unger negative capability addresses the problem of agency in relation to structure and unlike other theories of structure and agency, negative capability would not reduce the individual to a simple actor possessing only the dual capacity of compliance or rebellion.

=== Wilfred Bion ===
The twentieth-century British psychoanalyst Wilfred Bion elaborated on Keats's term to illustrate an attitude of openness of mind which he considered of central importance, not only in the psychoanalytic session, but in life itself. For Bion, negative capability was the ability to tolerate the pain and confusion of not knowing, rather than imposing ready-made or omnipotent certainties upon an ambiguous situation or emotional challenge. His idea has been taken up more widely in the British Independent School, as well as elsewhere in psychoanalysis and psychotherapy.

=== Dimitris Lyacos ===
Greek author Dimitris Lyacos has considered people living "in the margins" as possessing the negative capability that permits them to cross boundaries and, by accepting "the burden of the mystery", explore uncertainty and the flux of life against western norms and structures. In a 2018 interview in Berfrois Magazine Lyacos noted: "We carry with us a backpack of ideas, theories, insecurities and the detailed scenarios we project onto the future. Unlike us, outcasts, fugitives and people in the margins are the ones possessing the negative capability, the power to bear the "burden of the mystery"; immigrants cross seas that might engulf them. Their fear is overcome not only by the hope of a better life but also by their acceptance of those darker alleys, where time and space are created at the moment in which they are experienced."

=== Zen ===
The notion of negative capability has been associated with Zen philosophy. Keats' man of negative capability had qualities that enabled him to "lose his self-identity, his 'imaginative identification' with and submission to things, and his power to achieve a unity with life". The Zen concept of satori is the outcome of passivity and receptivity, culminating in "sudden insight into the character of the real". Satori is reached without deliberate striving. The antecedent stages to satori: quest, search, ripening and explosion. The "quest" stage is accompanied by a strong feeling of uneasiness, resembling the capacity to practice negative capability while the mind is in a state of "uncertainties, mysteries and doubts". In the explosive stage (akin to Keats' 'chief intensity'), a man of negative capability effects a "fellowship with essence".

=== Mindfulness ===
When humans are presented with external stress, the autonomic nervous system provides them with a 'fight or flight' response, a binary choice. Fight or flight has been called positive capability,. Teachers of mindfulness stress the importance of cultivating negative capability in order to overcome and provide an alternative to our routine reactions to stress. They point out that mindfulness teaches tolerance of uncertainty, and enriches decision making. It may not be productive to discuss whether negative or positive capability is more important, as they are analogous to the poles of a battery: a battery is only a battery if it has both positive and negative terminals.

== Criticism ==
In 1989 Stanley Fish expressed strong reservations about the attempt to apply the concept of negative capability to social contexts. He criticized Unger's early work as being unable to chart a route for the idea to pass into reality, which leaves history closed and the individual holding onto the concept while kicking against air. Fish finds the capability Unger invokes in his early works unimaginable and unmanufacturable that can only be expressed outright in blatant speech, or obliquely in concept. More generally, Fish finds the idea of radical culture as an oppositional ideal in which context is continuously refined or rejected impracticable at best, and impossible at worst. Unger addressed these criticisms by developing a full theory of historical process in which negative capability is employed.

In The Life in the Sonnets, David Fuller made use of negative capability in 2012, addressing the qualities and potential of writing literary criticism. A critic's experience and feelings altogether form a strong framework to expand one's ability in critical thinking, while negative capability replaces the notion of correctness in analyzing literary texts.

== In film, poems, songs, and popular culture ==
Woody Allen introduces the concept into the dialogue of his film Manhattan, primarily in a satirical, tongue-in-cheek manner.

In 2013, jazz guitarist Bern Nix released an album titled Negative Capability, containing liner notes explaining Keats definition.

In 2018, the British singer-songwriter Marianne Faithfull released an album entitled Negative Capability.

In November 2020, the BBC broadcast the second instalment of the second series of His Dark Materials based on the eponymous trilogy by Philip Pullman. Here the idea of negative capability is given great prominence. It is presented not as an idea, nor a theory, concept nor a thesis, but as a mood which the heroine Lyra is able to sink into, and which enables her special ability to read the rare and beautiful and truth-telling 'alethiometer', device that issues a code that cannot be understood by purely reductive means.

== See also ==
- Anti-foundationalism
- Evenly-suspended attention
- Limit-experience
- Unsaid
- Unthought known
