= False necessity =

Contemporary social theory

False necessity, or anti-necessitarian social theory, is a contemporary social theory that argues for the plasticity of social organizations and their potential to be shaped in new ways. The theory rejects the assumption that laws of change govern the history of human societies and limit human freedom. It is a critique of "necessitarian" thought in conventional social theories (like liberalism or Marxism) which hold that parts of the social order are necessary or the result of the natural flow of history. The theory rejects the idea that human societies must be organized in a certain way (for example, liberal democracy) and that human activity will adhere to certain forms (for example if people were only motivated by rational self-interest).

False necessity uses structural analysis to understand sociopolitical arrangements, but discards the tendency to assemble indivisible categories and to create law-like explanations. It aims to liberate human activity from necessary arrangements and limitations, and to open up a world without constraints where the possible becomes actual.

== Background ==
Modern social theory contains a tension between the realization of human freedom and the necessity of social rules. Liberal political theorists of the seventeenth century, such as Hobbes and Locke, saw the issue as one of sacrificing some individual freedoms in order to gain others. They understood social rules as enabling constraints—necessary impositions that limited activity in some spheres in order to expand it in others. In the sociopolitical realm, these early liberal thinkers argued that citizens agree to surrender their freedom for political authority in order to gain greater freedom from a state of nature. The sovereign authority is a constraint, but it allows freedom from the constraints that other individuals might impose upon us. In this way, rules are always seen as a means of increasing freedom rather than rescinding it.

These early Enlightenment thinkers opposed existing religious, aristocratic, and absolutist institutions and organizations as the natural state of the world. They did not argue for the absolute freedom of the individual outside of any constraining rules. For them, human activity was still subject to certain types of social arrangements that followed a historical necessity.

Inspired by Kant's thesis of human freedom, which argued that there is no evidence to disprove man's absolute freedom or capacity to resist external domination, thinkers at the end of the 18th century addressed how human freedoms were constrained by social institutions. Thinkers like Fichte, Schiller, Schelling, and Hegel argued that those institutions that constrain human freedom and subject the individual to fear and prejudice insult human dignity and deny the individual his autonomy. But they attempted to formulate universal laws, which in turn led to deterministic social and political arrangements. Marx, for example, put humanity at the mercy of historical and institutional necessity.

The contemporary theory of false necessity attempts to realize this idea in its entirety, and to escape the limitations of liberal and Marxist theories. It aims to realize social plasticity by decoupling human freedom from any necessary social rules or historical trajectory. The theory recognizes the need for social rules, but also affirms the human potential to transcend them. Humanity need not be constrained by any structure.

== Development and content ==
The development of the theory is credited to philosopher and politician Roberto Mangabeira Unger. His main book on the thesis, False Necessity: Anti-necessitarian social theory in the service of radical democracy, was first published in 1987 by Cambridge University Press, and reissued in 2004 by Verso with a new 124 page introduction, and a new appendix, "Five theses on the relation of religion to politics, illustrated by allusions to Brazilian experience."

The theory of false necessity attempts to understand humans and human history without making its theorists objects of a law-giving fate. It rejects the assumption that certain and necessary laws of organization and change govern the social, political, and economic institutions of human activity and thereby limit human freedom. It holds that the problem with traditional deep structure theory, such as Marxism, is that it couples the distinction of deep structure and routine practice with both indivisible types of social organization, and deep seated constraints and developmental laws. The theory rejects the constraints and focuses on how human behavior is shaped by the deep structures of these institutions, and how they can be remade at will, either in whole or in part. The aim is to rescue social theory and recreate the project of self-affirmation and society.

Rather than "enabling constraint" or "universal structure", the theory advocates "structure-denying structures"—that is, structures that enable their own dissolution and remaking. Since these structures normally constrain human activity, this would increase freedom.

== Sources of entrapment and emancipation ==
The problem of false necessity arises due to the failure of transformative practice to realize its stated aim. This can take form in three different scenarios:

- the ideals fought for (democracy, decentralization, technical coordination, etc.) result in the development of rigid institutions
- an oligarchy effect in which groups and rulers clash at the summit of power and drum up popular support
- the survival effect in which there is a fear of disturbance of contemporary arrangements.

Unger points to mass politics as a means to counter oligarchy and group identity. If these forms are only disturbed and not destroyed, democracy is limited and becomes a quarrel about forms of power and seizing advantage. Likewise, enlarged economic rationality provides another source of emancipation by shifting economic and social relations in the ability to constantly innovate and renew.

== Radical project ==
The theory of false necessity develops the idea that the organization of society is made and can be remade—people can rebel against the worlds they have built; they can interrupt their rebellions and establish themselves in any of those worlds. By emphasizing the disembodiment of institutional and social structures, the theory provides a basis to explain societies without using necessitarian thought or predetermined institutional arrangements.

At the extreme, the theory of false necessity criticizes and thus unifies strands of the radical tradition. It frees leftist and liberal ideals from institutional fetishism, and emancipates modernist ideals from structural fetishism. The theory further detaches the radical commitment from utopian claims and provides a theoretical basis for transformative action. That transformative action, Unger believes, does not have to be a complete overhaul or total revolution, but rather is "a piecemeal but cumulative change in the organization of society". The key to the project, in the words of one critic, "is to complete the rebellion against the naturalistic fallacy (that is, the confusion of accident with essence and contingency with necessity) and to effect an irrevocable emancipation from false necessity".

== Thinkers and opinions ==
Contemporary political thinkers and philosophers have developed and advocated the theory of false necessity. Roberto Mangabeira Unger has employed the theory in developing social, political, and economic alternatives, as well as in his political activism and appointments in Brazilian politics. Richard Rorty compared the theory's move toward greater liberalism with Jürgen Habermas, and called it a powerful alternative to the postmodern "School of Resentment". Other thinkers have said the theory is "a challenge that the social disciplines can ignore only at their peril". Bernard Yack wrote that it contributed to "a new left Kantian approach to the problem of realizing human freedom in our social institutions".

== See also ==
- Determinism
- Empowered democracy
- Formative context
- Historical determinism
- Necessitarianism
- Negative capability
- Postanarchism
