= The Left Alternative =

2009 book by Roberto Mangabeira Unger

- Author: Roberto Mangabeira Unger
- Language: English
- Genre: Political theory
- Publisher: 2009 (Verso)
- Publication place: United States
- Pages: 197
- ISBN: 978-1-84467-370-4
- OCLC: 1314098
- LC Class: JA83 .U64 2009
- Preceded by: Free Trade Reimagined
- Followed by: The Religion of the Future

The Left Alternative is a 2009 book by philosopher and politician Roberto Mangabeira Unger. In the book, Unger identifies problems with contemporary leftism and proposes a way to achieve the goals that he believes should be central to the progressive cause: inclusive economic growth through the heating up of politics and democratizing the market economy, a relentless process of institutional innovation that depends less upon crisis for change, and depends more on shortening the distance between context-preserving and context-transforming moves. The Left Alternative was first published in 2006 as What Should the Left Propose?

== Overview ==
In The Left Alternative, Unger describes the situation of the world today as a "dictatorship of no alternatives": a condition in which in the world seems to offer few alternatives for lifting the majority of people out of lives of poverty, drudgery, and belittlement. Progressives content themselves with "humanizing the inevitable", merely softening the effects of existing institutions. Unger contends that there are fragments of alternatives being developed across the world, but these do not appeal to the West and often amount to "local heresies" that would not survive a sustained challenge. What Unger proposes is a "universalizing heresy"—a set of ideas that are rooted in an attempt to achieve economic growth with social inclusion, and comprehensive and general enough to apply across the world. Such an alternative, envisioned by this universalizing heresy, would describe a narrow gateway through which all societies must pass on the way to creating actual difference.

Unger contends that the contemporary left is disoriented, bereft of any plausible or compelling alternatives to the neoliberal consensus that has gained in authority and influence in the rich western countries, and missing as well the ideas to support such an alternative, agents to advance the alternative, or a crisis that would be an impetus for adopting the alternative. But there is an alternative, Unger argues, one that would show how to combine both social inclusion and individual empowerment in political, economic and social institutions. This alternative would reshape production and politics, would refuse to see familiar forms of market economy, representative democracy and free civil society as necessary or canonical, would reject the contrast between market-oriented and command-economy solutions as a focus of ideological contests, would focus more on equality and inclusion within a setting of economic growth and technological innovation, than on increasing equality by redistribution through tax-and-transfer. The solution would democratize and radicalize the market economy by innovating in its arrangements and rethinking its logic. The overall aim of social policy would be to enhance individual capabilities through education and social inheritance, advance democratization of the market economy, and establish institutions of high-energy politics. The guiding philosophy of Unger's proposal, he explains, is "not the humanization of society; it is the divinization of humanity." Unger sees this alternative as applicable across a broad range of richer and poorer societies, thus making possible a "universalizing heresy" that can oppose the universalizing orthodoxy promulgated by the rich Western countries on a take-it-or-leave-it basis.

The agents of this program, Unger explains, are workers who want to be petty bourgeois, and nations that want to be different. The practice that has the most potential to spread the program throughout the world is "innovation-friendly cooperation", a set of practices currently concentrated in the best firms and schools, that have been highly successful in spreading technological innovations across the globe. But rather than leaving the practice of innovation-friendly cooperation within the confines of a global network of elite firms and schools, Unger proposes that these practices be nurtured and extended with the assistance of government, extending the benefits of innovation-friendly cooperation to classes and communities that have traditionally been excluded from these benefits.

Unger sees this "left alternative" as offering great potential for developing countries, in helping them achieve both national difference and prosperity for their citizens, while rejecting the neoliberal agenda that threatens to stifle real national difference as the price of entry into global markets. The left alternative offers a chance for European countries to reinvent and reinvigorate social democracy, which has gradually been stripped of programs that represented democracy's most ambitious hopes of fostering individual freedom, prosperity, and dignity. And Unger's proposal offers the United States a chance to enact a fitting sequel to the New Deal, the promise of which was betrayed by decades of misguided progressive policies that alienated a great many of leftism's natural constituency and undermining the attempt to form a trans-racial progressive majority.

According to Unger, an insidious tendency in world politics has been the manner in which globalization, as it is currently practiced and proselytized, has become a "generic alibi for surrender" to the status quo, and a mechanism for suppression of promising political, economic, and social alternatives. Unger argues that the question should not be "how much globalization?" but rather "what manner of globalization?" The objective of Unger's progressive alternative is a "qualified pluralism: a world of democracies."

Unger concludes by describing two competing conceptions of the left. The first conception, the one that is preeminent today, is what Unger calls a "fake egalitarianism": an institutionally conservative leftism that is committed to greater equality of life chances, sought principally through redistributive tax-and-transfer. The second conception, the one for which Unger argues, is one that has the goal of making us bigger, both collectively and individually, and seeks equality only to the extent that inequality diminishes us and threatens us with indignity and privation. This second conception, rather than being institutionally conservative, would support a practice of institutional experimentation with the goal of democratizing the market, deepening democracy, and empowering individuals.

== Reception ==
Reviewing The Left Alternative in the London Review of Books, Tom Nairn summarized Unger's ideas as follows:

Unger sets out the following key idea: 'The larger goal is a fuller mobilisation of national resources: a war economy without a war', fostering 'the institutions of a high-energy democracy'. Small nations can mean big, even universal lives and ideas; but they will go on requiring 'a shield over national heresy', a fostering of it, a mobilisation of resources 'that allows petitioners to become rebels'... His arguments are overwhelmingly prescriptive lists of institutional changes that few will find undesirable and fewer still could imagine being implemented in, say, Wales, Finland, Kurdistan, Taiwan or Basra.

While Nairn acknowledged the appeal of Unger's ideas, he concluded that the book was disappointingly general in its application: "Think tank manifestos normally address a specific population in a specific tongue, before being translated (with appropriate changes) for others. But Unger's are written in a synthetic fusion of legal American and Brazilian that seems to belong everywhere and nowhere... Unger dwells on [a] weirdly anational plane."

Michael B. Mathias reviewed The Left Alternative in Marx and Philosophy. He wrote that the book is "a concise introduction to [Unger's] recent thought, which has shifted towards a more pragmatic and centrist position. Unger's basic aim here is to emancipate the world from 'the dictatorship of no alternatives' by offering a constructive Leftist program." Mathias was critical of the book's ambitions: "Unger certainly captures the dismay that many of us feel in the face of an implacable neoliberal orthodoxy and the constriction of human possibilities that it entails. And he offers a well-deserved rebuke to those on the Left who have become institutionally conservative in attitude and abandoned any transformative ambition. Nonetheless, what Unger characterizes as the 'first steps' in a new direction seem more like giant leaps given the political realities that presently constrain opportunities for change."

Publishers Weekly called The Left Alternative a "stimulating visionary manifesto". The review went on to offer a mixed assessment of the book:

Some readers will no doubt find his sweeping indictment of social democracy unfair, his co-optation of avant-garde management theory naive, and his celebration of change and upheaval utopian. Many of his proposals, like privatizing social services or making everyone hold a second job in the "caring economy" tending to the old, the young, the sick, the poor or the desperate (no, family members don't count), are ill thought-out. Still, he offers an incisive critique of social and economic discontents, one that turns traditional Marxist formulations on their heads ("we... are, in large numbers, petty-bourgeois now.") The result is a provocative challenge to left orthodoxies that should spur plenty of controversy and fresh thinking.

Critique: Journal of Socialist Theory reviewed the book as follows: "The Left Alternative—previously named What Should the Left Propose? (2005)—presents itself as a proposal for the Left to change the world and offers many crucial 'directions' to the Left in order to achieve genuine democracy." The review concludes that "this book provides some interesting proposals to change the world. However, the author does not entirely deny the existing economic and political systems but attempts to reform, reshape and improve them. This book should be recommended to anyone who questions the legitimacy of the capitalist world and to those who have faith in the idea that 'another world is possible'."

== See also ==
- Empowered democracy
- Participatory economics

== Sources ==
- Buddharaksa, Watcharabon (May 31, 2013). "Review of What Should the Left Propose". Critique: Journal of Socialist Theory. 41 (1): 137–142.
- Mathias, Michael B. (November 18, 2010). "Review of The Left Alternative". Marx and Philosophy Review of Books.
- Nairn, Tom (October 18, 2007). "The Enabling Boundary". The London Review of Books. Vol. 29, no. 20. pp. 5–7.
- "Review of What Should the Left Propose". Publishers Weekly. March 20, 2006.
- Unger, Roberto Mangabeira (2009). The Left Alternative. New York: Verso.
- Unger, Roberto Mangabeira (2006). What Should the Left Propose?. New York: Verso.
