= Formative context =

Formative contexts are the institutional and imaginative arrangements that shape a society's conflicts and resolutions. They are the structures that limit both the practice and the imaginative possibilities in a socio-political order, and in doing so shape the routines of conflict over social, political and economic resources that govern access to labor, loyalty, and social station, e.g. government power, economic capital, technological expertise, etc. In a formative context, the institutions structure conflict over government power and capital allocation, whereas the imaginative framework shapes the preconceptions about possible forms of human interaction. Through this, a formative context further creates and sustains a set of roles and ranks, which mold conflict over the mastery of resources and the shaping of the ideas of social possibilities, identities and interests. The formative context of the Western democracies, for example, include the organization of production through managers and laborers, a set of laws administering capital, a state in relation to the citizen, and a social division of labor.

== Background ==
Also referred to as order, framework, or structure of social life, the concept of formative context was developed by philosopher and social theorist Roberto Unger. Whereas other social and political philosophers have taken the historical context as a given, and seen one existing set of institutional arrangements as necessarily giving birth to another set, Unger rejects this naturalization of the world and moves to explain how such contexts are made and reproduced. The most forceful articulation and development of the concept is in Unger's book False Necessity.

The thesis of formative context is central to Unger's theory of false necessity, which rejects the idea of a closed number of institutional arrangements of human societies, e.g. feudalism and capitalism, and that these arrangements are the product of historical necessity, as theories of liberalism or Marxism claim. Rather, Unger argues that there are myriad institutional arrangements that can coalesce, and that they do so through a contingent process of struggle, reconciliation, and innovation among individuals and groups. For Unger, the concept of formative context serves to explain the basis of a certain set of institutional arrangements and their reliance upon each other. It offers an explanation of the cycles of reform and retrenchment of a socio-economic political system and how it remains undisturbed by rivalries and animosities. The theory of false necessity goes on to explain the connections of a formative context, their making and remaking, and how they maintain stability despite the contingent formation.

== Criteria ==
While a formative context of a society exerts a major influence on the course of social actions and behaviors, it is itself hard to challenge, revise, or even identify in the midst of everyday conflicts and routines. Thus there are two kinds of criteria for determining if an institution or structure belongs in a formative context, subjective and objective ones. The subjective criteria consider the perspective of the social actors themselves and the arrangements that are assumed in their speech and actions. For example, the attempts of big business and labor to protect themselves through deals with each other, and the political efforts of unorganized labor and petty bourgeoisie to undermine and circumvent these deals by pressuring the government, operate on the same institutional assumption of the distinction between economy and polity, and that victory in one can be offset by the other. The objective criteria are simply that if a substitution of the proposed structure affects the hierarchies or cyclical conflicts—if it alters the social divisions—then it can be included in the formative context. For example, a change in any one of the following conditions would completely change the formative context of a Western democratic state: if the state stopped being democratic or was democratic enough to allow collective militancy and subject private centers of power to public accountability; if business could have its way and override all regulatory controls of govt; or if no workers could unionize or all of them could and did.

== Western democracies ==
The formative context of the North Atlantic democracies can be organized into four clusters of institutional arrangements: work, law, government, and occupational structure.

- The work-organization complex makes a distinction in work between task definers and task executers, with the material rewards concentrated in the task defining jobs.
- The private-rights complex understands the rights of the individual vis-a-vis other individuals and the state. This structure is central to the allocation and control of capital, ensuring all forms of capital distribution and entitlement.
- The government-organization complex is the institutional arrangement to protect the individual from the state, and to prevent those in power from changing the formative context. It establishes a link between safeguards of freedom and the dispersion of powers, e.g. partisan rivalries fail to extend to debates over the fundamental institutions that affect social interactions.
- The occupational-structure complex is a social division of labor characterized by a lack of caste or religious division. It is based on material reward and task defining jobs receiving the highest pay.

== Influences in other fields ==
The thesis of formative contexts has been heavily drawn on and used within the Social Study of Information Systems. In the field of Information systems Claudio Ciborra and Giovan Lanzara define the term "formative context" as the "set of institutional arrangements and cognitive imageries that inform actors' practical and reasoning routines in organisations". They posit that the common inability to inquire into, challenge or shape formative context can inhibit individuals and organizations from acting competently and learning what they need to know in order to make the most of situations and technological transitions as the enchaining effect of Formative Context can lead to cognitive and social inertia.

== See also ==
- Empowered democracy
- Negative capability
- Structure and agency
