= Empowered democracy =

Social theory of politics

Empowered democracy is a form of social-democratic arrangements developed by Brazilian philosopher and politician Roberto Mangabeira Unger, who first published his theories in 1987. Theorized in response to the repressiveness and rigidity of contemporary liberal democratic society, the theory of empowered democracy envisions a more open and more plastic set of social institutions through which individuals and groups can interact, propose change, and effectively empower themselves to transform social, economic, and political structures. The key strategy is to combine freedom of commerce and governance at the local level with the ability of political parties at the central level to promote radical social experiments that would bring about decisive change in social and political institutions.

The theory of empowered democracy has received widespread critical acclaim. It has been hailed as the only such constructive vision of society in critical legal studies, and the term has since seeped into the mainstream media, even if the theory has not. Meanwhile, Cornel West, Perry Anderson, Richard Rorty, and numerous other prominent scholars have published detailed—and, very often, admiring—essays on Unger's project.

== Overview ==
In practice, the theory would involve radical developments in politics at the center, as well as social innovation in localities. At the center, by bestowing wide ranging revisionary powers to those in office, it would give political parties the ability to try out concrete yet profound solutions and proposals. It would turn partisan conflicts over control and uses of governmental power into an opportunity to question and revise the basic arrangements of social life through a rapid resolution of political impasse. In local communities, empowered democracy would make capital and technology available through rotating capital funds, which would encourage entrepreneurship and innovation. Citizens rights include individual entitlements to economic and civic security, conditional and temporary group claims to portions of social capital, and destabilization rights, which would empower individuals or groups to disrupt organizations and practices marred by routines of subjugation that normal politics have failed to disrupt.

== Policy points ==
Alongside the philosophy of empowered democracy, Unger has laid out concrete policy proposals in areas of economic development, education, civil society, and political democracy.

- On economic development, Unger has noted that there are only two models for a national economy available to us today: the US model of business control of government, and the northeast Asian model of top down bureaucratic control of the economy. Citing the need for greater imagination on the issue, he has offered a third model that is decentralized, pluralistic, participatory, and experimental. This would take the form of an economy encouraging small business development and innovation that would create large scale self-employment and cooperation. The emphasis is not on the protection of big business as the main sectors of the economy, but the highly mobile and innovative small firm.
- Unger links the development of such an economy to an education system that encourages creativity and empowers the mind, not one that he now sees geared for a reproduction of the family and to put the individual in service of the state. He proposes that such a system should be run locally but have standards enforced through national oversight, as well as a procedure in place to intervene in the case of the failing of local systems.
- Unger's critique of and alternative to social programs goes to the heart of civil society. The problem we are faced with now, he claims, is that we have a bureaucratic system of distribution that provides lower quality service and prohibits the involvement of civil society in the provision of public services. The alternative he lays out is to have the state act to equip civil society to partake in public services and care. This would entail empowering each individual to have two responsibilities, one in the productive economy and one in the caring economy.
- Unger's proposal for political democracy calls for a high energy system that diminishes the dependence of change upon crisis. This can be done, he claims, by breaking the constant threat of stasis and institutionalization of politics and parties through five institutional innovations. First, increase collective engagement through the public financing of campaigns and giving free access to media outlets. Second, hasten the pace of politics by breaking legislative deadlock though the enabling of the party in power to push through proposals and reforms, and for opposition parties to be able to dissolve the government and call for immediate elections. Third, the option of any segment of society to opt out of the political process and to propose alternative solutions for its own governance. Fourth, give the state the power to rescue oppressed groups that are unable to liberate themselves through collective action. Fifth, direct participatory democracy in which active engagement is not purely in terms of financial support and wealth distribution, but through which people are directly involved in their local and national affairs through proposal and action.

== See also ==
- Agonistic democracy
- False necessity
- Formative context
- Radical democracy
