= Antinomy =

Term in philosophy

In philosophy, an antinomy (/ænˈtɪnəmi/; Ancient Greek: antí 'against' + nómos 'law') is a real or apparent contradiction between two conclusions, both of which seem justified. It is a term used in logic and epistemology, particularly in the philosophy of Immanuel Kant.

Antinomy is a common form of argument in the dialogues of Plato. Kant credited Zeno of Elea (see Zeno's paradoxes) as the inventor of the antinomic mode of argumentation, which he described as a "skeptical method" of "watching, or rather provoking, a conflict of assertions, not for the purpose of deciding in favor of one or the other side, but of investigating whether the object of the controversy is not perhaps a deceptive appearance which each vainly tries to grasp, and in regard to which, even if there were no opposition to overcome, neither can arrive at any result".

The antinomic procedure was further developed by Fichte, Schelling and Hegel. Hegel said that Kant was in error when he limited the antinomies to cosmological ideas, claiming that the world itself contains contradiction. Schopenhauer said that the antitheses in Kant's antinomies were justified, but claimed the theses (cosmological propositions) to be sophisms.

== Terminology ==
Antinomies can be found in Plato, in substance though not by this name (cf. Phaedo 102; Rep. 523 ff., Parm. 135 E). Modern usage dates back to a 17th-century legal term, which acquired philosophical significance in Immanuel Kant's Critique of Pure Reason (CPR). In the Transcendental Dialectic, Kant defines an antinomy as a "conflict of laws" (CPR A407/B434).

Kant's use of the term was derived from jurisprudence, where it refers to a conflict between laws, and from biblical exegesis, where it refers to conflict between passages of scripture.

In modern logic, the term "antinomy" is not used consistently and is sometimes not clearly distinguished from the term paradox. In the German language, however, it is customary to reserve the term "antinomy" for contradictions that can be rigorously proven within the framework of a formal system and which thus indicate an error in the conception of the rules of inference or the axioms of that system (e.g. the antinomies of naive set theory, the best known being Russell's paradox). In contrast, a paradox (Ancient Greek παρά para "beside, apart" and δόξα doxa "expectation, opinion", παράδοξον paradoxon "contrary to expectation, contrary to common opinion") is usually used to describe a well-founded statement that contradicts conventional wisdom, but which does not cause any real logical difficulties. Many scientific insights can appear paradoxical in this harmless sense (e.g., the twin paradox in Einstein's theory of relativity or the so-called paradoxes of material implication in formal logic; see relevance logic). In English, the term antinomy is not particularly widespread and its application is mostly limited to Kantian antinomies.

In modern logic, a "contradiction" is simply understood as the conjunction of a statement and its negation, i.e. a statement of the form $A \land \lnot A$ (read: "A and not-A"). This broad term is neutral with regard to the question of provability or justifiability, and includes, for example, contradictions that are derived within a proof by contradiction specifically for the purpose of negating one of the assumptions involved in the derivation. Therefore, not all contradiction is philosophically problematic.

Separately from this usage, the word "contradiction" is also used in Hegelian dialectics, where it includes social conflict, antagonisms and such.

== Kant's use ==
The term acquired a special significance in the philosophy of Immanuel Kant (1724–1804), who used it to describe the equally rational but contradictory results of applying to the universe of pure thought the categories or criteria of reason that are proper to the universe of sensible perception or experience (phenomena). Empirical reason cannot here play the role of establishing rational truths because it goes beyond possible experience and is applied to the sphere of that which transcends it.

For Kant there are four antinomies, connected with:

- the limitation of the universe in respect to space and time
- the theory that the whole consists of indivisible atoms (whereas, in fact, none such exist)
- the problem of free will in relation to universal causality
- the existence of a universal being

In each antinomy, a thesis is contradicted by an antithesis. For example: in the first antinomy, Kant proves the thesis that time must have a beginning by showing that if time had no beginning, then an infinity would have elapsed up until the present moment. This is a manifest contradiction because infinity cannot, by definition, be completed by "successive synthesis"—yet just such a finalizing synthesis would be required by the view that time is infinite; so the thesis is proven. Then he proves the antithesis, that time has no beginning, by showing that if time had a beginning, then there must have been "empty time" out of which time arose. This is incoherent (for Kant) for the following reason: Since, necessarily, no time elapses in this pretemporal void, then there could be no alteration, and therefore nothing (including time) would ever come to be: so the antithesis is proven. Reason makes equal claim to each proof, since they are both correct, so the question of the limits of time must be regarded as meaningless.

This was part of Kant's critical program of determining limits to science and philosophical inquiry. These contradictions are inherent in reason when it is applied to the world as it is in itself, independently of any perception of it (this has to do with the distinction between phenomena and noumena). Kant's goal in his critical philosophy was to identify what claims are and are not justified, and the antinomies are a particularly illustrative example of his larger project.

== Marx's use ==
In the book Das Kapital, Volume I in the chapter "The Working Day", Karl Marx claims that capitalist production sustains "the assertion of a right to an unlimited working day, and the assertion of a right to a limited working day, both with equal justification". Author James Furner claims that the thesis and antithesis of this antinomy are not contradictory opposites, but rather "consist in the assertion of rights to states of affairs that are contradictory opposites".

== See also ==
Mutual incompatibility

- Law:
  - Alternative pleading
- Logic:
  - Mutual exclusivity
  - Kettle logic
  - Paradox
  - Self-refuting idea
- Religion:
  - Antinomianism (Christianity)
- Other:
  - Oxymoron
  - Double bind
