= Paradigm =

Set of distinct concepts or thought patterns

In science and philosophy, a paradigm (/ˈpærədaɪm/ PARR-ə-dyme) is a distinct set of concepts or thought patterns, including theories, research methods, postulates, and standards for what constitute legitimate contributions to a field. The word paradigm is Greek in origin, meaning "pattern". It is closely related to the discussion of theory-ladenness in the philosophy of science.

== Etymology ==
Paradigm comes from Greek παράδειγμα (parádeigma); "pattern, example, sample"; from the verb παραδείκνυμι (paradeíknumi); "exhibit, represent, expose"; and that from παρά (pará); "beside, beyond"; and δείκνυμι (deíknumi); "to show, to point out".

In classical (Greek-based) rhetoric, a paradeigma aims to provide an audience with an illustration of a similar occurrence. This illustration is not meant to take the audience to a conclusion; however, it is used to help guide them to get there.

One way of how a paradeigma is meant to guide an audience would be exemplified by the role of a personal accountant. It is not the job of a personal accountant to tell a client exactly what (and what not) to spend money on, but to aid in guiding a client as to how money should be spent based on the client's financial goals. Anaximenes defined paradeigma as "actions that have occurred previously and are similar to, or the opposite of, those which we are now discussing".

The original Greek term παράδειγμα (parádeigma) was used by scribes in Greek texts (such as Plato's dialogues Timaeus [c. 360 BCE] and Parmenides) as one possibility for the model or the pattern that the demiurge supposedly used to create the cosmos.

The English-language term paradigm has technical meanings in the fields of grammar (as applied, for example, to declension and conjugation – the 1900 Merriam-Webster dictionary defines the technical use of paradigm only in the context of grammar) and of rhetoric (as a term for an illustrative parable or fable). In linguistics, Ferdinand de Saussure (1857–1913) used paradigm to refer to a class of elements with similarities (as opposed to syntagma – a class of elements expressing relationship.).

The Merriam-Webster Online dictionary defines one usage of paradigm as "a philosophical and theoretical framework of a scientific school or discipline within which theories, laws, and generalizations and the experiments performed in support of them are formulated; broadly: a philosophical or theoretical framework of any kind."

The Oxford Dictionary of Philosophy (2008) attributes the following description of the term in the history and philosophy of science to Thomas Kuhn's 1962 work The Structure of Scientific Revolutions:

Kuhn suggests that certain scientific works, such as Newton's Principia or John Dalton's New System of Chemical Philosophy (1808), provide an open-ended resource: a framework of concepts, results, and procedures within which subsequent work is structured. Normal science proceeds within such a framework or paradigm. A paradigm does not impose a rigid or mechanical approach, but can be taken more or less creatively and flexibly.

== Scientific paradigm ==
The Oxford English Dictionary defines a paradigm as "a pattern or model, an exemplar; a typical instance of something, an example". The historian of science Thomas Kuhn gave the word its contemporary meaning when he adopted the word to refer to the set of concepts and practices that define a scientific discipline at any particular period of time. In his book, The Structure of Scientific Revolutions (first published in 1962), Kuhn defines a scientific paradigm as: "universally recognized scientific achievements that, for a time, provide model problems and solutions to a community of practitioners, i.e.,

- what is to be observed and scrutinized
- the kind of questions that are supposed to be asked and probed for answers in relation to this subject
- how these questions are to be structured
- what predictions made by the primary theory within the discipline
- how the results of scientific investigations should be interpreted
- how an experiment is to be conducted, and what equipment is available to conduct the experiment.

In The Structure of Scientific Revolutions, Kuhn saw the sciences as going through alternating periods of normal science, when an existing model of reality dominates a protracted period of puzzle-solving, and revolution, when the model of reality itself undergoes sudden drastic change. Paradigms have two aspects. Firstly, within normal science, the term refers to the set of exemplary experiments that are likely to be copied or emulated. Secondly, underpinning this set of exemplars are shared preconceptions, made prior to – and conditioning – the collection of evidence. These preconceptions embody both hidden assumptions and elements that Kuhn describes as quasi-metaphysical. The interpretations of the paradigm may vary among individual scientists.

Kuhn was at pains to point out that the rationale for the choice of exemplars is a specific way of viewing reality: that view and the status of "exemplar" are mutually reinforcing. For well-integrated members of a particular discipline, its paradigm is so convincing that it normally renders even the possibility of alternatives unconvincing and counter-intuitive. Such a paradigm is opaque, appearing to be a direct view of the bedrock of reality itself, and obscuring the possibility that there might be other, alternative imageries hidden behind it. The conviction that the current paradigm is reality tends to disqualify evidence that might undermine the paradigm itself; this in turn leads to a build-up of unreconciled anomalies. It is the latter that is responsible for the eventual revolutionary overthrow of the incumbent paradigm, and its replacement by a new one. Drawing on N. R. Hanson's discussion of theory-ladenness, Kuhn used the expression paradigm shift (see below) for this process, and likened it to the perceptual change that occurs when our interpretation of an ambiguous image "flips over" from one state to another. (The rabbit-duck illusion is an example: it is not possible to see both the rabbit and the duck simultaneously.) This is significant in relation to the issue of incommensurability (see below).

An example of a currently accepted paradigm would be the Standard Model of physics. The scientific method allows for orthodox scientific investigations into phenomena that might contradict or disprove the Standard Model; however grant funding would be proportionately more difficult to obtain for such experiments, depending on the degree of deviation from the accepted Standard Model theory the experiment would test for. To illustrate the point, an experiment to test for the mass of neutrinos or the decay of protons (small departures from the model) is more likely to receive money than experiments that look for the violation of the conservation of momentum, or ways to engineer reverse time travel.

Mechanisms similar to the original Kuhnian paradigm have been invoked in various disciplines other than the philosophy of science. These include: the idea of major cultural themes, worldviews (and see below), ideologies, and mindsets. They have somewhat similar meanings that apply to smaller and larger scale examples of disciplined thought. In addition, Michel Foucault used the terms episteme and discourse, mathesis, and taxinomia, for aspects of a "paradigm" in Kuhn's original sense.

== Paradigm shifts ==
In The Structure of Scientific Revolutions, Kuhn wrote that "the successive transition from one paradigm to another via revolution is the usual developmental pattern of mature science" (p. 12).

Paradigm shifts tend to appear in response to the accumulation of critical anomalies as well as in the form of the proposal of a new theory with the power to encompass both older relevant data and explain relevant anomalies. New paradigms tend to be most dramatic in sciences that appear to be stable and mature, as in physics at the end of the 19th century. At that time, a statement generally attributed to physicist Lord Kelvin famously claimed, "There is nothing new to be discovered in physics now. All that remains is more and more precise measurement." Five years later, Albert Einstein published his paper on special relativity, which challenged the set of rules laid down by Newtonian mechanics, which had been used to describe force and motion for over two hundred years. In this case, the new paradigm reduces the old to a special case in the sense that Newtonian mechanics is still a good model for approximation for speeds that are slow compared to the speed of light. Many philosophers and historians of science, including Kuhn himself, ultimately accepted a modified version of Kuhn's model, which synthesizes his original view with the gradualist model that preceded it. Kuhn's original model is now generally seen as too limited.

Some examples of contemporary paradigm shifts include:

- In medicine, the transition from "clinical judgment" to evidence-based medicine
- In social psychology, the transition from p-hacking to replication
- In software engineering, the transition from the Rational Paradigm to the Empirical Paradigm
- In artificial intelligence, the transition from classical AI to data-driven AI

Kuhn's idea was, itself, revolutionary in its time. It caused a major change in the way that academics talk about science; and, so, it may be that it caused (or was part of) a "paradigm shift" in the history and sociology of science. However, Kuhn would not recognize such a paradigm shift. Being in the social sciences, people can still use earlier ideas to discuss the history of science.

=== Paradigm paralysis ===
Perhaps the greatest barrier to a paradigm shift, in some cases, is the reality of paradigm paralysis: the inability or refusal to see beyond the current models of thinking. This is similar to what psychologists term confirmation bias and the Semmelweis reflex. Examples include rejection of Aristarchus of Samos', Copernicus', and Galileo's theory of a heliocentric solar system, the discovery of electrostatic photography, xerography and the quartz clock.

== Incommensurability ==
Kuhn pointed out that it could be difficult to assess whether a particular paradigm shift had actually led to progress, in the sense of explaining more facts, explaining more important facts, or providing better explanations, because the understanding of "more important", "better", etc. changed with the paradigm. The two versions of reality are thus incommensurable. Kuhn's version of incommensurability has an important psychological dimension. This is apparent from his analogy between a paradigm shift and the flip-over involved in some optical illusions. However, he subsequently diluted his commitment to incommensurability considerably, partly in the light of other studies of scientific development that did not involve revolutionary change. One of the examples of incommensurability that Kuhn used was the change in the style of chemical investigations that followed the work of Lavoisier on atomic theory in the late 18th century. In this change, the focus had shifted from the bulk properties of matter (such as hardness, colour, reactivity, etc.) to studies of atomic weights and quantitative studies of reactions. He suggested that it was impossible to make the comparison needed to judge which body of knowledge was better or more advanced. However, this change in research style (and paradigm) eventually (after more than a century) led to a theory of atomic structure that accounts well for the bulk properties of matter; see, for example, Brady's General Chemistry. According to P J Smith, this ability of science to back off, move sideways, and then advance is characteristic of the natural sciences, but contrasts with the position in some social sciences, notably economics.

This apparent ability does not guarantee that the account is veridical at any one time, of course, and most modern philosophers of science are fallibilists. However, members of other disciplines do see the issue of incommensurability as a much greater obstacle to evaluations of "progress"; see, for example, Martin Slattery's Key Ideas in Sociology.

== Subsequent developments ==
Opaque Kuhnian paradigms and paradigm shifts do exist. A few years after the discovery of the mirror-neurons that provide a hard-wired basis for the human capacity for empathy, the scientists involved were unable to identify the incidents that had directed their attention to the issue. Over the course of the investigation, their language and metaphors had changed so that they themselves could no longer interpret all of their own earlier laboratory notes and records.

=== Imre Lakatos and research programmes ===
However, many instances exist in which change in a discipline's core model of reality has happened in a more evolutionary manner, with individual scientists exploring the usefulness of alternatives in a way that would not be possible if they were constrained by a paradigm. Imre Lakatos suggested (as an alternative to Kuhn's formulation) that scientists actually work within research programmes. In Lakatos' sense, a research programme is a sequence of problems, placed in order of priority. This set of priorities, and the associated set of preferred techniques, is the positive heuristic of a programme. Each programme also has a negative heuristic; this consists of a set of fundamental assumptions that – temporarily, at least – takes priority over observational evidence when the two appear to conflict.

This latter aspect of research programmes is inherited from Kuhn's work on paradigms, and represents an important departure from the elementary account of how science works. According to this, science proceeds through repeated cycles of observation, induction, hypothesis-testing, etc., with the test of consistency with empirical evidence being imposed at each stage. Paradigms and research programmes allow anomalies to be set aside, where there is reason to believe that they arise from incomplete knowledge (about either the substantive topic, or some aspect of the theories implicitly used in making observations).

=== Larry Laudan and research traditions ===
Larry Laudan has also made two important contributions to the debate. Laudan believed that something akin to paradigms exist in the social sciences (Kuhn had contested this, see below); he referred to these as research traditions. Laudan noted that some anomalies become "dormant", if they survive a long period during which no competing alternative has shown itself capable of resolving the anomaly. He also presented cases in which a dominant paradigm had withered away because its lost credibility when viewed against changes in the wider intellectual milieu.

== In social sciences ==
Kuhn himself did not consider the concept of paradigm as appropriate for the social sciences. He explains in his preface to The Structure of Scientific Revolutions that he developed the concept of paradigm precisely to distinguish the social from the natural sciences. While visiting the Center for Advanced Study in the Behavioral Sciences in 1958 and 1959, surrounded by social scientists, he observed that they were never in agreement about the nature of legitimate scientific problems and methods. He explains that he wrote this book precisely to show that there can never be any paradigms in the social sciences. Mattei Dogan, a French sociologist, in his article "Paradigms in the Social Sciences", develops Kuhn's original thesis that there are no paradigms at all in the social sciences since the concepts are polysemic, involving the deliberate mutual ignorance between scholars and the proliferation of schools in these disciplines. Dogan provides many examples of the non-existence of paradigms in the social sciences in his essay, particularly in sociology, political science and political anthropology.

However, both Kuhn's original work and Dogan's commentary are directed at disciplines that are defined by conventional labels (such as "sociology"). While it is true that such broad groupings in the social sciences are usually not based on a Kuhnian paradigm, each of the competing sub-disciplines may still be underpinned by a paradigm, research programme, research tradition, and/ or professional imagery. These structures will be motivating research, providing it with an agenda, defining what is and is not anomalous evidence, and inhibiting debate with other groups that fall under the same broad disciplinary label. (A good example is provided by the contrast between Skinnerian radical behaviourism and personal construct theory (PCT) within psychology. The most significant of the many ways these two sub-disciplines of psychology differ concerns meanings and intentions. In PCT, they are seen as the central concern of psychology; in radical behaviourism, they are not scientific evidence at all, as they cannot be directly observed.)

Such considerations explain the conflict between the Kuhn/ Dogan view, and the views of others (including Larry Laudan, see above), who do apply these concepts to social sciences.

In 1986, M. L. Handa introduced the idea of "social paradigm" in the context of social sciences. He identified the basic components of a social paradigm. Like Kuhn, Handa addressed the issue of changing paradigm; the process popularly known as "paradigm shift". In this respect, he focused on social circumstances that precipitate such a shift and the effects of the shift on social institutions, including the institution of education. This broad shift in the social arena, in turn, changes the way the individual perceives reality.

Another use of the word paradigm is in the sense of "worldview". For example, in social science, the term is used to describe the set of experiences, beliefs and values that affect the way an individual perceives reality and responds to that perception. Social scientists have adopted the Kuhnian phrase "paradigm shift" to denote a change in how a given society goes about organizing and understanding reality. A "dominant paradigm" refers to the values, or system of thought, in a society that are most standard and widely held at a given time. Dominant paradigms are shaped both by the community's cultural background and by the context of the historical moment. Hutchin outlines some conditions that facilitate a system of thought to become an accepted dominant paradigm:

- Professional organizations that give legitimacy to the paradigm
- Dynamic leaders who introduce and purport the paradigm
- Journals and editors who write about the system of thought. They both disseminate the information essential to the paradigm and give the paradigm legitimacy
- Government agencies who give credence to the paradigm
- Educators who propagate the paradigm's ideas by teaching it to students
- Conferences conducted that are devoted to discussing ideas central to the paradigm
- Media coverage
- Lay groups, or groups based around the concerns of lay persons, that embrace the beliefs central to the paradigm
- Sources of funding to further research on the paradigm

== Other uses ==
The word paradigm is also still used to indicate a pattern or model or an outstandingly clear or typical example or archetype, a "paradigm case". The term is frequently used in this sense in the design professions. Design Paradigms or archetypes comprise functional precedents for design solutions. The best known references on design paradigms are Design Paradigms: A Sourcebook for Creative Visualization, by Wake, and Design Paradigms by Petroski.

This term is also used in cybernetics. Here it means (in a very wide sense) a (conceptual) protoprogram for reducing the chaotic mass to some form of order. Note the similarities to the concept of entropy in chemistry and physics. A paradigm there would be a sort of prohibition to proceed with any action that would increase the total entropy of the system. To create a paradigm requires a closed system that accepts changes. Thus a paradigm can only apply to a system that is not in its final stage.

Beyond its use in the physical and social sciences, Kuhn's paradigm concept has been analysed in relation to its applicability in identifying 'paradigms' with respect to worldviews at specific points in history. One example is Matthew Edward Harris' book The Notion of Papal Monarchy in the Thirteenth Century: The Idea of Paradigm in Church History. Harris stresses the primarily sociological importance of paradigms, pointing towards Kuhn's second edition of The Structure of Scientific Revolutions. Although obedience to popes such as Innocent III and Boniface VIII was widespread, even written testimony from the time showing loyalty to the pope does not demonstrate that the writer had the same worldview as the Church, and therefore pope, at the centre. The difference between paradigms in the physical sciences and in historical organisations such as the Church is that the former, unlike the latter, requires technical expertise rather than repeating statements. In other words, after scientific training through what Kuhn calls 'exemplars', one could not genuinely believe that, to take a trivial example, the earth is flat, whereas thinkers such as Giles of Rome in the thirteenth century wrote in favour of the pope, then could easily write similarly glowing things about the king. A writer such as Giles would have wanted a good job from the pope; he was a papal publicist. However, Harris writes that 'scientific group membership is not concerned with desire, emotions, gain, loss and any idealistic notions concerning the nature and destiny of humankind...but simply to do with aptitude, explanation, [and] cold description of the facts of the world and the universe from within a paradigm'.

== See also ==
- Algorithm – Sequence of operations for a task
- Argument from analogy – Logical reasoning method
- Basic beliefs – Axioms under the epistemological view called foundationalism
- Case-based reasoning – Process of solving new problems based on the solutions of similar past problems
- Cognitive model – Model of cognition's operation
- Concept – Fundamental unit of cognition
- Theory-ladenness – Degree to which an observation is affected by one's presuppositions
- Conceptual framework – Method of organizing information
- Conceptual model – Theoretical framework
- Conceptual schema – High-level database design model
- Construct (philosophy) – Object whose existence depends upon a subject's mind
- Contextualism – Subject of inquiry in philosophy and linguistics
- Dogma – Beliefs accepted by members of a group without question
- Dispositif – Philosophical term
- Flying geese paradigm – View that the economic policies of postwar Japan will uplift Asian economies
- Groupthink – Psychological phenomenon that occurs within a group of people
- Heuristic – Problem-solving method
- Ideology – Set of beliefs or values
- Thomas Kuhn – American philosopher (1922–1996)
- Mental model – Mental representation of the external world
- Mental representation – Hypothetical internal cognitive symbol that represents external reality
- Metalinguistic abstraction – Principle in computer science of domain-specific languages for problem solving
- Metanarrative – Overarching narrative
- Methodology – Study of research methods
- Mindset – Term in decision theory and general systems theory
- Perspectivism – Philosophical principle that perspectives and epistemology are always linked
- Point of view (philosophy) – Concept of personal perspective in philosophy
- Poststructuralism – Philosophical school and tradition
- Programming paradigm – High-level computer programming conceptualization
- Schema (psychology) – Pattern of thought or behavior
- School of thought – Group sharing common opinion
- Scientific Revolution – Emergence of modern science (1572-1687)
- Set (psychology) – Group of expectations in psychology
- Structuralism – Intellectual current and methodological approach in the social science
- The Structure of Scientific Revolutions – 1962 book by Thomas S. Kuhn
- Trading zones (metaphor) – Metaphor applied to collaborations in science
- Triune continuum paradigm
- World view – Fundamental cognitive orientation of an individual or society
- The history of the various paradigms in evolutionary biology (Wikiversity)
