= Repugnancy =

In common law, repugnancy refers to a contradiction or inconsistency between clauses of the same document, deed, or contract, or between allegations of the same pleading. In English law, the court will resolve contradictions in a document based on the primary intention of the parties; if this cannot be established, the court treats the earlier statement as effective in the case of a deed and the later statement as effective in the case of a will.
