= Passion: An Essay on Personality =

Book by Roberto Mangabeira Unger

- Author: Roberto Mangabeira Unger
- Language: English
- Genre: Philosophy
- Publisher: Free Press
- Publication date: 1984
- Publication place: United States
- Pages: 300
- Preceded by: Law In Modern Society: Toward a Criticism of Social Theory
- Followed by: The Critical Legal Studies Movement

Passion: An Essay on Personality is a philosophical inquiry into human nature by Brazilian philosopher and politician Roberto Mangabeira Unger. The book explores the individual and his relation to society, asking how one comes to an understanding of self and others. Unger here sees the root human predicament as the need to establish oneself as a unique individual in the world but at the same time to find commonality and solidarity with others. This exploration is grounded in what Unger calls a modernist image of the human being as one who lives in context but is not bound by context.

Unger's aim is twofold. First, to level a critique, expansion, and defense of modern thinking about the human and society “so that this practice can better withstand the criticisms that philosophy since Hume and Kant has leveled against it.” And second, to develop a prescriptive theory of human identity centered on what Unger calls the passions—our raw responses to the world that are ambivalent towards reasons but also act in the service of reason. He outlines nine passions that organize and are organized by our dealings with others: lust, despair, hatred, vanity, jealousy, envy, faith, hope, and love. While these emotional states may be seen as raw emotion, their expression is always conditioned by the context within which the individual mobilizes or learns to mobilize them.

The book was critically hailed as successfully grappling with some of the most fundamental and enduring problems of human existence. It has been put into direct dialogue with Kant's moral law, and said to have provided one answer to Hume's Guillotine. Unger's analysis and the program he builds around this revolutionary understanding has also inspired new thinking and approaches to psychiatry.

== Background ==
Entering into a long philosophical tradition of inquiry into human nature, Unger begins by categorically rejecting the idea of a natural order to the world or a natural state of human organization. For Unger, there are no natural laws. Rather, he takes to the hilt the modernist thesis that we are shaped by context but not bound by context. As such, we have the power to work both within and beyond any constraints of social or cultural binds.

This perspective is derived from the Christian-Romantic tradition. Unger argues that this tradition has two themes: interpersonal relations with love as the redemptive moment, and that a person's identity is not defined by membership in social ranks and division. This then gives expression to the idea that humans are never at home in the world and that they are constantly striving to remake the world. The modernist development takes up this theme but emphasizes interpersonal relations over impersonal reality or good so that no institutional settings can limit the possibilities of humanity. We “can assert [our] independence only by perpetual war against the fact of contextually…”

=== Normative force ===
In laying forth a view of human nature and prescription of self-affirmation, Unger recognizes that he faces the predicament of employing one system of thought that has developed out of particular historical circumstances and is thus no better or worse than any other system of thought. Indeed, under what auspices can such a philosophical orientation be turned into a normative prescription?

Unger turns this question from one of general principles to one of the enactment of a vision or project of self-affirmation. For Unger, at issue here is not the pure speculation of philosophical inquiry into the nature of human beings and their activities, but rather a transformative project of self and society. In this way, the task is to realize a vision and enact a program of self-affirmation. The only alternative is to find a better one or fail at self-affirmation. The standards by which Unger confirms a project of self-affirmation are as follows: socially it is unstable if it fails to deal with behavior predispositions or material constraints, and existentially it fails if it disregards recurrent features of our experience, e.g. dependence upon others.

Unger looks closely at existential projects that fail: the heroic ethic (delusional about historic setting, which negates the ethic), and the impersonal absolute ethic (Buddhism, which tries but cannot divest itself of the world). Both respond to the fact of the individual not being the center of the world. However, by doing so they disengage from the world and others. While Confucianism addresses interdependence, the philosophy elevates it to a level of canonical hierarchy and thus imposes strict constraints.

=== Towards a psychology of empowerment ===
Unger sees the Christian-Romantic tradition as the one tradition that puts the individual at the center of the world and gives him the tools for the liberation of self and environment. However, similar to the world's religious and philosophical traditions, it fails to provide a lasting answer to the predicament of human existence. This failure is the constant danger that after liberation the self will return to its customary affairs and routine practices. Rather than moving onwards to greater feats of humanity and godlike existence, the individual will allow everyday affairs to again take over. This surrender to habit is directly linked to the defeat of the imagination. Thus metaphysical revolution is needed through a psychology of empowerment and an analysis of social conditions upon which this empowerment relies. Unger's project begins here.

== Contents ==
Passion begins with a long introductory foray into the Western philosophical tradition of human nature before moving onto a four-part meditation of human experience and expression. In part one, he sets out to define passion as the noninstrumental dealings that we have with others; they organize and are organized around the need and danger that is at the heart of our relations with others. This definition is developed out of the argument that the individual is in constant conflict in the world: at once attempting to assert the self as individual and establish difference, but at same time to gain acceptance by others. We are thus defined by the mutual need and reliance upon each other, and the mutual fear of each other in acceptance or rejection. Passion is at the heart of this reciprocal and infinite terror and longing for each other.

In part two, Unger attempts to explain how one becomes capable of passion. He charts out a path by which the individual first has desire, which is then augmented with imagination. The imagination reveals an insatiability of the infinite sense of self, which is but then contingent upon the acceptance of others. With this recognition, then, the contingency of the self is revealed. With the further realization of death we come to see that nothing outside of the self can fulfill desire; we want to see the self as transcending all of the fixed social world.

In part three, Unger addresses the passions themselves. As James Glass in Political Psychology writes, "Not only do these passions civilize and humanize experience; their practice transcends social status, framework, and stratification. Existing beyond class and history, they possess an autonomy that resists the disintegrative pull of power and self-interest, the historical and social differences induced by envy, jealousy, pride, and vanity." Unger describes each one in a way that brings out the need-danger antinomy and the context dependent-transcended dichotomy.

- Lust and despair are proto-social destructive forces that must be tamed for civil order to ensue.
- Hatred, vanity, jealousy, and envy underscore failures to accept one another's presence in the world.
- Faith, hope, and love resolve conflicts that seemed insoluble and break through barriers.

Part four charts the task ahead, which Unger says is to find the collective equivalents to the personal experiences of love, faith, and hope. We must strive to discover the structures that can realize these passions in the everyday world. All too often visions of the future human and environment exclude from social life the personal connections represented in the passions, choosing instead to focus on the recreation of the material world. Unger's call, however, is to take full account of the passions so we may transcend our context and become more godlike.

The book's appendix is "A Program for Late Twentieth-Century Psychiatry," an apropos article previously published in the American Journal of Psychiatry in 1982, whose argument can be summed up as "psychoanalytic theory offers opportunities to replicate, but not to transform, individual and social contexts."

== Reception ==
The book has been met with critical but high acclaim in both legal and philosophical circles. In his Times review, Jerome Neu, celebrated the book as "some of the most brilliant writing of this kind since Hegel." Other reviewers have similarly praised it for its "heretical presence both in contemporary social science and philosophy, a point of view that refuses both the "scorched earth campaign of radical skepticism" and the limitations of a social and political theory that roots meaning in transcendental or metaphysical absolutes." Yet reviewers have also expressed reservations over "Unger's style, his normative reflections, his erudition and elusiveness." The Michigan Law Review asked for a more concrete articulation of Unger's idea, claiming that he left both his idea of the individual and program for psychiatry too ambiguous. "That Unger's best society would be a place of playfulness and laughter is, however, only implicit in Passion, and Unger's failure to describe the mirthfulness of the world of love exemplifies the speculative tone that marks the central failure of the work as a whole." Similarly, James Boyle in the Harvard Law Review said that the speculative philosophy detracted from the effectiveness of the message, and thought the argument would have been better served with personal example.

J. Allan Hobson, in the pages of the Northwestern University Law Review, capitalized on the inspiration of Unger's thesis to develop a new psychiatric program in "advanc[ing] from a set of slogans to testable hypotheses." He praised Unger for pinpointing the root of the problem--"Psychoanalysis is out of gas, and biological psychiatry is not yet up to speed. As a field in crisis, psychiatry is ripe for change."—but found Unger's theory of personality and program "hopelessly inadequate" because it was too speculative and failed to address biological data. Hobson attempted to develop a theory that would incorporate this biological data.
