= Self-contradiction =

Self-contradiction or self-contradictory can refer to:

- Auto-antonym, a word with multiple meanings of which one is the reverse of another
- Oxymoron, a figure of speech that juxtaposes concepts with opposing meanings within a word or phrase that creates an ostensible self-contradiction
- Paradox, a logically self-contradictory statement or a statement that runs contrary to one's expectation
- Self-refuting idea or reductio ad absurdum, idea or statement whose falsehood is a logical consequence of the original

== See also ==
- Contradiction
