= Argument in the alternative =

Legal strategy

Originating in the legal profession, argument in the alternative is a strategy in which a lawyer advances several competing (and possibly mutually exclusive) arguments in order to pre-empt objections by his adversary, with the goal of showing that regardless of interpretation there is no reasonable conclusion other than the advocate's. The notion is closely related to alternative pleading, and the two terms are sometimes used interchangeably.

A lawyer might argue, not only that his client was elsewhere when a murder or other crime took place, but also that even if he had been on the scene, he would have had no way of accessing the alleged murder weapon. In this way, the lawyer attacks several premises of the prosecution's argument at once. The secondary line of reasoning might be presented to persuade a sub-audience who would not otherwise agree with the primary argument.

In regards to contract law, arguing in the alternative is done where a dispute arises over the terms of a contract. In a particular case it may be best for the plaintiff to allege that a statement made was to become a term of the contract. However the circumstances of the case may be such that the plaintiff cannot be certain that the court will accept this argument. To allow for this possibility, all the plaintiff need do is to argue in the alternative that the statement was in fact a representation (which allows for remedies based on misrepresentation) or again in the alternative that the statement became a part of a collateral contract.

Occasionally, such arguments can be confusing to some people, who perceive a self-contradiction or lack of honesty. Generally speaking, this is a case of mistakenly thinking the argument claims both alternatives are true, when in reality it is claiming only that one or the other of them must be. But arguing in the alternative certainly heightens the complexity of any given presentation.

== See also ==
- Alternative pleading
- Kettle logic
- Disjunction elimination
- Hypothetical syllogism
- Paradigm case argument
