= Allegation =

Claim of an unproven fact by a party in a pleading

In law, an allegation is a claim of an unproven fact by a party in a pleading, charge, or defense. Until they can be proved, allegations remain merely assertions.

== Types of allegations ==
=== Civil complaints ===
Generally, in a civil complaint, a plaintiff alleges facts sufficient to establish all the elements of the claim and thus states a cause of action. The plaintiff must then carry the burden of proof and the burden of persuasion in order to succeed in the lawsuit.

A defendant can allege affirmative defenses in its answer to the complaint.

Other allegations are required in a pleading to establish the correct jurisdiction, personal jurisdiction and subject matter jurisdiction.

=== Disjunctive allegations ===
Disjunctive allegations are allegations in a pleading joined by an "or". In a complaint, disjunctive allegations are usually per se defective because such a pleading does not put the party on notice of which allegations they must defend.

On the other hand, defendants often plead in the alternative by listing seemingly inconsistent defenses. For example, "I did not do the crime", "if I did, I didn't know", or "even if I did know, I've got a good excuse". Such a pleading may be considered disjunctive and may be permissible.

=== Marital allegations ===
There are also marital allegations: marriage bonds and allegations exist for couples who applied to marry by licence. They do not exist for couples who married by banns. The marriage allegation was the document in which the couple alleged (or most frequently just the groom alleged on behalf of both of them) that there were no impediments to the marriage.

== Terminology ==
"Adduction" is another term relating to allegations. Evidence is said to be adduced, in the process of putting forward or presenting evidence or arguments for consideration by the court. Scots law uses the verb "aver" and the noun "averment" for stating or alleging a claim.

== See also ==
- Accusation
- False accusation
- Reasonable doubt
