= Law in Modern Society =

Law in Modern Society: Toward a Criticism of Social Theory
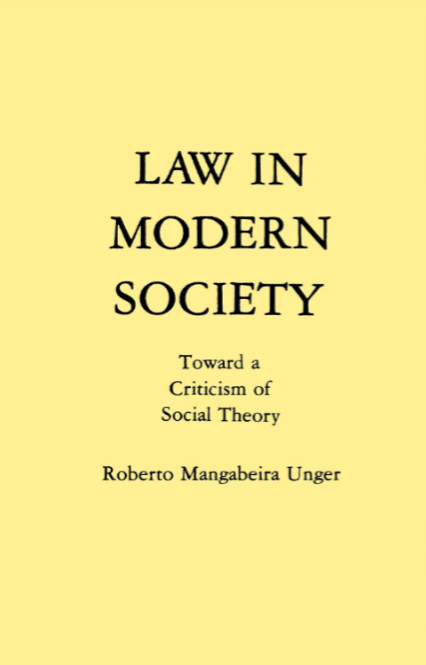
- Cover of paperback edition of Law in Modern Society
- Author: Roberto Mangabeira Unger
- Language: english
- Genre: Law
- Publisher: 1976 (Free Press)
- Publication place: United States
- Pages: 309
- ISBN: 0-02-932860-8
- OCLC: 1322201
- LC Class: K370 .U54 1976
- Preceded by: Knowledge and Politics
- Followed by: Passion: An Essay on Personality

Law in Modern Society: Toward a Criticism of Social Theory is a 1976 book by philosopher and politician Roberto Mangabeira Unger. In the book, Unger uses the rise and decline of the rule of law as a vehicle to explore certain problems in social theory. According to Unger, problems that were central concerns of classical social theorists like Marx, Durkheim, and Weber—the problems of explanation, order, and modernity—remain unsolved. Unger contends that the failure of classical social theory to solve these dilemmas can be traced to the way in which it asserted its independence from the ancient political philosophers, namely in its denial of a supra-historical human nature and in its insistence upon the contrast of fact and value. Unger argues that a radical reorientation of social theory is needed to solve the problems it faces. "To carry out its own program," Unger writes, "social theory must destroy itself." The rise and decline of the rule of law, and the dilemmas of social theory, converge in the need to be able to compare and criticize different forms of society, in order to be able to more effectively submit the organization of society to the human will.

== Overview ==
=== Chapter 1: The Predicament of Social Theory ===
Unger opens Law in Modern Society by connecting the study of law to the unsolved problems of social theory. Social theory is the tradition originating in the writings of Montesquieu and culminating with the work of Marx, Durkheim, and Weber. In Unger's view, classic social theory as represented by these thinkers is marked by an insistence on the distinction between fact and value, description and evaluation, and also by a denial of a unitary human nature. Unger contrasts classic social theory with the political philosophy of the ancients, who did not recognize as sharp a distinction between fact and value, and maintained that there is a universal human nature that exists in all times and places.

The study of law affords a vantage point from which to explore three unsolved problems of social theory, according to Unger. The first, the problem of method, is that the prevailing methodological approaches to social study are inadequate. The rationalist approach (as seen in the works of economists) and the historicist approach (which accepts the function of cause and effect but not logical entailment) both invite deterministic social explanations. Unger contends that we need a third method, one that is generalizing, and yet also open to rich historical particularity while not falling into deterministic explanations.

The second problem is the problem of social order. How do we account for the existence of a social order? Classical social theory is represented by a struggle between the doctrines of instrumentalism (or private interest) versus legitimacy (or consensus). The legitimacy approach sees rules as manifestations of the shared values of a group. The instrumentalist approach sees society as made up of many divergent individual wills, and rules serve the instrumental purpose of helping the members of society achieve their privately chosen aims in the long run. Utilitarianism is an example of an instrumentalist approach. According to Unger, we need to go beyond the partial truths expressed in each doctrine.

The third unsolved problem of social theory is the problem of modernity. What marks the experience of modernity? What is its place in world history? What is the relationship between ideology and actuality in modern life? Our social theory must be able to reconcile the subjective experience of society with its objective meaning. As history transpires, new puzzles are added to the experience of studying modernity. A large part of the problem of modernity is the difficulty of comparing modern forms of social life: modern Western society with its forebears, and different forms of contemporary society (traditional, revolutionary socialist, postliberal) among themselves.

The program of classic social theory has value, according to Unger—namely in allowing us to study human beings as they are rather than as they ought to be, and in helping us to inquire into how each society shapes conduct and consciousness of its members. These classical social theorists sought to create a body of objective knowledge of society that would not be at the mercy of metaphysical speculation or political controversy, and up to a point, they succeeded. But Unger concludes that the problems of social theory cannot be resolved unless the truths of classic social theory are reconciled with the insights of older political philosophy. We need a general doctrine of human nature.

=== Chapter 2: Law and the Forms of Society ===
In this chapter Unger addresses the varieties of law and explores the conditions under which each of them develops. Customary/interactional law is neither public nor positive, and consists of implicit standards of conduct, not formulated rules. Under a system of customary and interactional law, customs are characteristically inarticulate. Bureaucratic/regulatory law is public and positive, and emerges with the division of state and society. A legal order is a legal system that is committed to being general and autonomous, in addition to being public and positive.

From this discussion, he draws conclusions about the issue of social order as it relates to the development of law. Unger explains how disintegration of community is accompanied by a trend toward increasing specialization in a society's division of labor, a trend that is responsible for the separation of state and society. This process erodes the basis for an inclusive set of shared beliefs. The legal order emerges with interest group pluralism, as well as reliance on higher divine or universal law as standard for justifying and criticizing a state's positive law. The rule of law is a response to the decline of order in society. But when the belief in higher law declines, the legal order is threatened. In contemporary history, the natural rights synthesis that underlies the legal order ideal has been undone, with the result that the coherence of the rule of law ideal is compromised.

=== Chapter 3: Law and Modernity ===
In this chapter, Unger traces the rise and decline of the rule of law in society. He begins by setting out a preliminary framework for the comparison of societies, and uses this framework to examine tribal society, liberal society, and aristocratic society. Unger's inquiry into these types of society revolves around three questions: What is the nature of the contrast between insiders and outsiders? How are insiders drawn together in significant groups and what is the quality of their encounters with strangers? And, finally, how individuals conceive of the place of the ideal—do they have a concept of the right or the good that transcends the natural or social world?

Unger concludes that tribal society displays the starkest possible contrast between insiders and outsiders; outsiders are not regarded as human beings with whom the insiders share anything significant in common. There is a paucity of significant groups in tribal society. And there is little conception of a good or right that towers over the immanent reality of daily life or the natural world. The important insight, for Unger, is that tribal society is an extremely cohesive social world, where there is deep agreement about fundamental social questions, profound distrust of strangers, and no recognition of overarching ideals against which the quotidian life or nature can be compared.

At the other extreme, liberal society is one in which the contrast between insiders and outsiders is softened by the fact that each individual belongs to a large number of significant groups. Because members of liberal society become accustomed to other people being both insiders and outsiders in different contexts, the hostility of tribal society for the stranger is replaced, in liberal society, by ideals of impersonal respect and formal equality. People will abide by relatively stable standards of social order because it is to their advantage to do so, not because they observe identical conceptions of the true and the good. In liberal society, a concept of the right and the good transcends the reality of daily life and the natural world.

Unger views aristocratic society as a synthesis of tribal and liberal societies. Aristocratic society unites universalism and particularism. In aristocratic society, significant social groups are experienced as steps on a hierarchic ladder. Each individual belongs to a specific group, his estate, which confers on him a range of entitlements and obligations and predetermine his outlook on the world. These strata are sharply divided from each other and are decisive in determining the quality of the individual's life. Aristocratic society's view of the relationship between the ideal and the actual occupies an intermediate position between the views of tribal and liberal society. In aristocratic society, there is an intense oscillation between a tendency to sanctify existing social arrangements and the tendency to oppose them to a higher heavenly perfection.

Having set out a rudimentary grammar for the comparison of societies, Unger traces the emergence and decline of the liberal state and the rule of law (which Unger describes as the soul of liberal society).

Liberal society developed out of aristocratic society, namely the society of estates (Standestaat), which was an intermediary system between feudal society and the modern liberal state. The law of the Standestaat was a forerunner to the modern legal system, and consisted of an area of royal discretion (matters falling under the prince's prerogative to keep the peace) and a higher law (matters pertaining to the privileges and obligations of estates of the realm). The elements that make up a modern legal order—positiveness, publicity, generality and autonomy—were not present, but as the formerly neat line between royal prerogatives and the law of estates faded away, the prince was increasingly held to standards of generality and autonomy, and estate privileges acquired a public and positive character. The confinement of royal power by the fundamental law of the Standestaat was supported by a belief in a God-given natural order.

The liberal state—with its multiplicity of significant groups, the disappearance of a sharp distinction between insiders and outsiders, and a stark division between the ideal and the actual—faced two questions with increasing urgency: how can there be consensus without widespread agreement about the good, and how can we distinguish legitimate from illegitimate uses of power in the face of dissolving hierarchy and moral confusion? The rule of law, which attempted to guarantee the impersonality of power, was a way of dealing with these urgent questions.

The rule of law has two major premises—that the most significant forms of power can be concentrated in government, and that power can be effectively constrained by rules. But Unger contends that these premises are largely fictitious. They are undermined by the awareness that individuals are most vulnerable to hierarchies of the family, the workplace, and the market that are largely beyond the reach of the legal system, and also that rules can never make power truly impersonal and impartial—administrators and judges will always decide among competing sets of beliefs in rendering a decision.

Thus, the very assumptions of the rule of law ideal appear to be falsified by the reality of life in liberal society ... The state, a supposedly neutral overseer of social conflict, is forever caught up in the antagonism of private interests and made the tool of one faction or another. Thus, in seeking to discipline and to justify the exercise of power, men are condemned to pursue an objective they are forbidden to reach. And this repeated disappointment accentuates still further the gap between the vision of the ideal and the experience of actuality.

The contradictions and paradoxes of liberal society, by undermining the rule of law and the ideals it represents, ultimately give rise to what Unger calls postliberal society. Postliberal society is marked by overt intervention by the government in areas previously regarded as beyond the reach of state action, and a gradual approximation of state and society. The state's pretense of being a neutral guardian of the social order is abandoned. These trends are reflected in the rise of open-ended clauses in legislation, administration, and adjudication, and a concern with substantive justice over formal justice. The effacement of the boundary between state and society, called corporatism, leads to the rise of state institutions that rival the state in their power. Unger argues that these welfare state institutions are an assault on the legal order, while the corporatist tendencies in postliberal society undermine bureaucratic law. The danger of these tendencies, Unger contends, is demonstrated by the Weimar Republic, in which the decline of the rule of law in favor of a welfare corporate state set the stage for terror and inhumanity of Nazi Germany.

Unger concludes his examination of law and modernity by looking at two varieties of the modern state—the traditionalist state and the revolutionary socialist—then considering two possibilities for the development of law in the future. Seeing similar tensions within traditionalist and revolutionary socialist societies, Unger points out that the liberal state is only a special case of modernity. He concludes that there's no more reason to think that societies will converge toward similarity rather than grow in their differences.

The future of the rule of law, Unger suggests, could take two forms. The first, pessimistic, possibility he imagines is a scenario in which the progression of custom, bureaucracy, and rule of law revolves in a circle, and the postliberal decline of the rule of law would lead to the return of custom as the exclusive instrument of the social order. There would be a relapse of a tribalism that sanctifies the existing order of the group as an irrevocable decree of nature. The second possibility Unger imagines is an optimistic scenario, which Unger describes as a spiral in which "individual freedom could be rescued from the demise of the rule of law." On this model, society defeats inequality to such an extent that people place greater confidence in collective choices, not suspecting them as a product of the interests of dominant groups. The increasing equality of society would make possible a greater consensus about the immanent order of society and help refine further the meaning of equality.

=== Chapter 4: The Predicament of Social Theory Revisited ===
In this final chapter, Unger returns to the questions of the methodology of social theory with which he opened the book. For each of the unsolved problems of social theory—the problem of method, the problem of social order, and the problem of modernity—Unger concludes that the theoretical problems of social theory require a political solution.

For the problem of method, Unger offers the interpretive method as an alternative to the rationalist and historicist approaches favored by classical social theorists. The interpretive method, which emphasizes the embeddedness of action in belief and the way social phenomena cluster into meaningful totalities, avoids the tendency of rationalist and historicist methods to fall into deterministic accounts of human activity, while also offering the prospect of reconciling the demands of subjectivity and objectivity in social explanation. But the possibility of reconciling subjectivity and objectivity in social theory ultimately is premised on a belief in the unity of the human spirit, and in order to be achieved, we would need a community of experience, understanding and value to come into existence. For this reason, to solve the problem of method completely requires a political solution.

For the second persistent problem of social theory, the problem of social order, Unger sees the crux of this problem in the divergence between the doctrines of legitimacy/consensus and instrumentalism/private interest. These views offer completely different accounts of the basis for order in society. Unger allows that instrumentalism is more effective in explaining liberal society, while consensus theory comes closer in explaining tribal and hierarchical societies. Social study of law suggests a response to our puzzlement over the basis of order in society. It puts the controversy between the doctrines of private interest and consensus, and hence between the instrumental and noninstrumental view of rules, in perspective. But once again, a political solution is called for to deal with the divergence between instrumentalism and consensus theories: the crisis of order will only be fully resolved once it reconciles individual freedom with community cohesion, and the sense of immanent order with possibility of community cohesion.

Addressing the final unsolved problem of social theory, the problem of modernity, Unger concludes that we must reject the approaches offered by both liberalism, which views society as an association of individuals with conflicting ends and whose security and freedom are guaranteed by the rule of law, and Marxism, which sees society as a structure of class domination whose true character is hidden by the prevailing ideology. Unger argues we must focus on the interplay between belief and experience, consciousness and organization, in the study of modernity. This interplay takes new forms as history unfolds. The political problem presented by modernity—a problem confronted by postliberal, traditionalist, and revolutionary socialist societies—is the problem of reconciling freedom and community. Harmonizing the sense of latent order in society with the capacity to let will remake social arrangements is the key to reconciling freedom and community.

== Reception ==
Talcott Parsons reviewed Law in Modern Society for the Law & Society Review, and offered qualified praise for Unger's work. "The book is important because it contains one of the sharpest and clearest statements of the problem of what the author calls the place of a legal system in a total and complex society." However, Parsons contends that Unger erroneously claims that law as a social phenomenon is restricted to its interpenetration with the state. Parsons also "disagree[s] with [Unger's] characterization of the legal system as part of the structure of modern societies." Parsons concludes: "His is both an important and a good book, but it does not give the reader a competent and comprehensive appraisal of the issues which contemporary legal and 'social' theory need to confront in their mutual pursuit of an understanding of legal systems."

Manning J. Dauer reviewed Law in Modern Society in The Journal of Politics, describing the book as:

an able work arguing for a new synthesis in social sciences and in legal theory. The argument that traditionalistic aspects now need modifying is well presented. The rule of law is an important concept, but it has to be adapted to more individualistic judgments as the social sciences impinge on traditionalistic interpretations. Might he consider John Rawls's attempt to define Social Justice? Unger points out the need and the difficulties; the method whereby this will be achieved is still in process, but the dilemma presented to the social sciences is well stated.

German sociologist Klaus Eder considered Law in Modern Society alongside Donald Black's The Behavior of Law. Eder considered Unger's argument in detail, and concluded that Unger offered a promising research program for a sociological study of law:

This model of the evolution of law is an interesting working hypothesis, which may be especially fruitful for the analysis of changes in modern law. [Unger's] book is ... neither more nor less than a research program, probably a fruitful one, for the sociological study of law on two levels: a synchronic structural description of forms of normative order and a diachronic social-historical analysis of the factors that produce structural transformations of law.

James Stewart reviewed Law in Modern Society for the Journal of Economic Issues, writing that "this book should be read by those seeking to escape the limitations of existing social theory and particularly neoclassical economics. In particular, Unger's emphasis on the need to undertake cross-cultural analyses and his careful delineation of alternative concepts of law provide a useful guide for further developments in institutional economics."

Neil T. Duxbury wrote a retrospective assessment of Law in Modern Society in The Modern Law Review. Duxbury acknowledges Unger's commitment to "straddle the frontiers of social theory" in both Knowledge and Politics and Law in Modern Society, calling this persistence in addressing the most difficult questions of social theory a "defining feature of the book." However, Duxbury finds fault with the book, contending that

Unger's notion of post-liberalism is awash with over-generalised arguments. Contrary to his own suggestions, there appears to be no reason why the corporatist tendency within post-liberalism should result not only in a move towards the establishment of substantive justice, but also in the maintenance of the liberal tendency towards formal justice.

Duxbury concludes that Unger's work operates at such a vague and abstract level of generality, that his work might be invalidated by empirical evidence left unexplored by Unger:

Unger has continued to develop his 'modernist' position with a conceptual vagueness which suggests not so much that he should be criticised for theorising at a selected level of abstraction, but rather that, so long as he continues to operate at this level, he will always, if only potentially, be open to the charge of failing to pay sufficient attention to the empirical evidence on offer—evidence which may sometimes invalidate the conceptualisations to which he ascribes.

Alfred P. Rubin offered high praise for Law in Modern Society in Perspective:

It is impossible to do justice to this book in a short review. The evolution of society from status to contract and back to status has been noted by many other writers, but Professor Unger's framework for social analysis is in large part original, accessible only to sophisticated scholars, and possibly seminal.

== Sources ==
- Dauer, Manning J. (November 1977). "Review of Law in Modern Society". The Journal of Politics. 39 (4): 1105–1106. doi:10.2307/2129949. JSTOR 2129949.
- Duxbury, Neil T. (September 1986). "Look Back in Unger: A Retrospective Appraisal of Law in Modern Society". The Modern Law Review. 49 (5): 658–679. doi:10.1111/j.1468-2230.1986.tb01709.x.
- Eder, Klaus (1977). "Review of Law in Modern Society". Law and Society Review. 12: 133–144. doi:10.2307/3053323. JSTOR 3053323.
- Parsons, Talcott (1977). "Review of Law in Modern Society". Law and Society Review. 12: 145–149. doi:10.2307/3053324. JSTOR 3053324.
- Rubin, Alfred P. (June 1, 1976). "Review of Law in Modern Society". Perspective. 5 (5): 113–114.
- Stewart, James (December 1976). "Review of Law in Modern Society". Journal of Economic Issues. 10 (4): 987–991. doi:10.1080/00213624.1976.11503406. JSTOR 4224557.
- Unger, Roberto Mangabeira (1976). Law in Modern Society: Toward a Criticism of Social Theory. New York: The Free Press. ISBN 0-02-932860-8.
