= Knowledge and Politics =

Book by Roberto Mangabeira Unger

- Author: Roberto Mangabeira Unger
- Language: English
- Genre: Philosophy
- Publisher: 1975 (Free Press)
- Publication place: United States
- Pages: 341
- ISBN: 978-0029328705
- OCLC: 400847
- Dewey Decimal: 320.5/1
- LC Class: HM276.U53 1975
- Followed by: Law In Modern Society: Toward a Criticism of Social Theory

Knowledge and Politics is a 1975 book by philosopher and politician Roberto Mangabeira Unger. In it, Unger criticizes classical liberal doctrine, which originated with European social theorists in the mid-17th century and, according to Unger, continues to exercise a tight grip over contemporary thought, as an untenable system of ideas. This dominant set of ideas blocks the resolution of problems that liberal doctrine itself identifies as fundamental to human experience. Liberal doctrine, Unger writes, is an ideological prison-house that condemns people living under its spell to lives of resignation and disintegration. In its place, Unger proposes an alternative that he calls the "theory of organic groups," elements of which he finds emergent in partial form in the welfare-corporate state and the socialist state. The theory of organic groups, he contends, offers a way to overcome the divisions in human experience that make liberalism fatally flawed. The theory of organic groups shows how to revise society so that all people can live in a way that is more hospitable to the flourishing of human nature, particularly in enabling people to integrate their private and social natures, achieving a wholeness in life that has previously been limited to the experience of a small elite of geniuses and visionaries.

== Overview ==
=== Introduction ===
Unger opens Knowledge and Politics by explaining how he intends to criticize liberal doctrine and how that criticism will help lead to, and elucidate, a positive program: the creation of a nonliberal doctrine of mind and society. He explains that the rationale for this theoretical enterprise is rooted in the human desire to understand the “meaning of life,” specifically, the nature of the bond between the self and the world. Unger contends that the contemporary human moral experience is one of division, between a side of the self that maintains allegiance to the dominant theoretical and political regimes of society, and another side that is drawn to ideals that current modes of thought reject. Under this experience of division, Unger contends, human experience demands “total criticism” of the kind he intends to apply to the doctrine of liberalism.

Unger describes classical liberal doctrine as both a ruling consciousness of society and a metaphysical system, a system of ideas which involves a particular organization of moral sentiments. In human moral experience, liberalism's failure to satisfy the ideal of the self (which Unger later describes as the fullest expression of man's species nature) is experienced as the twin evils of resignation and disintegration. The early liberal thinkers and the classic social theorists understood the radical separations that mark human life, between self and nature, self and others, self and its own roles and works. By undertaking a total criticism of liberal doctrine, particularly by repudiating its distinction between reason and desire, and Unger intends to lay the groundwork for his positive program, the nonliberal social theory that would help to overcome these divisions and give full expression to a range of human feelings and ideas.

=== Chapter 1: Liberal Psychology ===
==== The Antinomy of Theory and Fact ====
The liberal doctrines of mind and society rejected the medieval view of knowledge which held that all things in nature have intelligible essences. Under the doctrine of intelligible essences, everything can be classified under the word that names its category. Liberal thinkers, in rejecting the doctrine of intelligible essences, realized that there is an infinite number of ways objects and events can be classified, infinite ways the world can be divided up by the mind. Liberalism's rejection of the doctrine of intelligible essences had far-reaching consequences for moral and political views. The rejection of intelligible essences also led to the antinomy of theory and fact, a seemingly insoluble conflict between two ideas that seemed equally plausible but led to equally absurd consequences. The antinomy of theory and fact is the conflict between, on the one hand, the realization that all understanding of facts is mediated by theory, and on the other hand, the belief in an independent comparison of theory and fact. Faced with the antinomy of theory and fact, we ask: how can we assess the power of competing theories, if there is no appeal to facts independently of theories? Kant's metaphysics offered a promising and ingenious solution—namely, locating the source of the antinomy in the division of universal and particular, form and substance, in human thought. The division between the universal and particular is at the heart of the contradictions of liberal thought.

==== The Principles of Liberal Psychology ====
Unger describes the “unreflective view of mind” that characterizes liberal psychology. According to this unreflective view of mind, the mind is a machine that perceives and understands facts (object-events) through sensations. These sensations can be combined, or split until they are indivisible. Combining sensations does not change them. Facts that have been combined can be analyzed back into their constituent sensations. Hobbes explained that desire is what impels the “mind-machine” to its operations of combination and analysis. What leads desire to choose one course of action over another is the desire to seek pleasure and avoid pain. This account of liberal doctrine's unreflective view of the mind can be reduced to three principles:

- The principle of reason and desire. The principle that the self is divided between desire, which is the active, desiring, moving part of the self, and understanding, which is the knowing part of the self. The understanding wants nothing; desire can see nothing. What distinguishes human beings is that they desire different things, not that they understand the world differently.
- The principle of arbitrary desire. This principle holds that desires are arbitrary from the perspective of the understanding. We cannot determine what we should want simply by learning more about the world. Reason cannot be used to justify the content of desires.
- The principle of analysis. This principle holds that knowledge is the sum of its parts. Operations of the mind by which we acquire knowledge involve either joining discrete sensations into more complex ideas, or breaking these complex ideas down into their building blocks. Underlying the principle of analysis is an idea at the heart of liberal doctrine as a whole: confidence in the primacy of the simple. The principle of analysis, according to Unger, reveals liberalism's incomplete rejection of the doctrine of intelligible essences, and has pernicious effects on social theory, by demoralizing attempts to construct ambitious conceptual systems and discouraging us from trying to understand, and change, social situations as a whole.

==== Reason and Desire ====
Liberal psychology gives rise to two kinds of moral theory, each of which are caught up in a paradox that Unger calls the antinomy of reason and desire. Both of these moralities are destructive of a true conception of human personality. One moral theory generated under liberal psychology is the morality of desire. This morality defines the good as the satisfaction of desire, and asserts the primacy of the good over the right. Contentment is the condition in which desire is satisfied, and the task of moral theory is to show how we might organize our lives so that we can gain contentment, or happiness. The other moral theory bequeathed by liberal psychology is the morality of reason, which holds that reason alone establishes the standards of right conduct. Unger points out that, in light of liberal doctrine's conviction that reason wants nothing, it might strike us as strange to contend that reason alone is a basis of morality. The basis for the morality of reason is the belief that humans must accept certain rules, offered by reason, to move beyond the exercise of “naked desire” to the possibility of judging right and wrong and justifying our actions to our fellow men. When reason is believed to offer us universal rules for conduct, it is really telling us what principles we would have to accept to engage in moral criticism. The foremost example of the morality of reason is Kant's moral theory.

The moralities of reason and desire are both vulnerable to serious objections. The morality of desire is deficient because it is incapable of passing from description to evaluation of conduct, and thus is unable to lay down standards of justification. Furthermore, the life to which morality of desire points is inadequate; contentment is elusive without any criteria to judge and order the ends of conduct. The morality of reason is inadequate, first, due to the inadequacy of reason to serve as a foundation for any moral judgments and, second, because the moral life as conceived by the moralist of reason is inadequate. The respective inadequacies of moralities of desire and reason generate an antinomy. If morality of desire abandons us to our random and changing appetites, morality of reason suppresses our existence as subjective beings with individual ends. The root of this antinomy of reason and desire is the separation between understanding and evaluation in liberal doctrine.

==== Personality ====
Unger contends that the psychological principles of liberalism make it impossible to formulate an adequate conception of personality. Unger identifies four dimensions of the minimum idea of personality: continuing identity, common humanity with others, ability to change ends over time while acknowledging continuity of existence, and being a unique individual despite membership in species of like beings. But neither the morality of desire nor morality of reason does justice to these qualities. The morality of desire denies continuity and humanity of the self, seeing the human being led by desire to seek contentment without any criteria for ordering the ends of conduct, while the morality of reason denies the human capacity for moral innovation and individual identity, offering a formal, empty principle of reason as the only guidance to what we ought to do.

The theoretical deficiencies of the liberal conception of personality are mirrored in the experience of the individual in the social world in which the liberal mode of consciousness prevails. The individual is condemned to a state of degradation and division, forced to deal with others in a social world that threatens the person with loss of individuality and loss of autonomy in directing his life, perpetually fleeing to private life for the chance to shed the mask of one's largely unchosen public role. People seek temporal unity in a public identity at the cost of their singularity and uniqueness. As Unger says, “Others save you from being nothing, but they do not allow you to become yourself.” Under liberalism, people are torn between roles that force them to sacrifice their private selves to their public ones, thus surrendering individual identity; or casting off convention and following their own courses, but risking disintegration of the self.

=== Chapter 2: Liberal Political Theory ===
==== The Unreflective View of Society ====
Unger outlines liberal political theory in much the same way that he described liberal psychology. He begins by describing the unreflective view of society that holds a central place in everyday thinking about social life, as well as in some specialized fields of study. According to this unreflective and widely held view of society, the individual is made up of reason and will. Reason is directed by will, the desiring element of personality. Human beings are blind creatures of appetite, but they are capable of objectively understanding the world, and some are more acute in their understanding than others. Despite their capacity for objective understanding, the things people desire are infinitely diverse. The universal desire for comfort and honor, under circumstances of scarcity, make mutual antagonism and mutual dependence inevitable and unavoidable. Freedom, or not being under the control of an alien will, is sought and experienced as a form of power. People form alliances to further their interests in hostility and collaboration. The two fundamental problems of politics, order and freedom, are consequences of this mutual antagonism and reciprocal need.

Society's first task is to place restraints on the exercise of mutual antagonism, so that mutual need can be satisfied. Such restraints moderate the struggle for comfort, power and glory, so that everyone can be protected from the worst outcomes for a person—grave indignity, harsh penury, enslavement, or violent death. How to control hostility between people is the problem of order. As soon as limits are placed on mutual antagonism, men encounter the problem of freedom: how to order society so that no one's liberty is arbitrarily preferred over another's, so that no one's arbitrarily chosen means and ends of striving take unjustifiable precedence over another's? Society tries to solve the problems of order and freedom by making and applying impersonal laws.

==== The Principles of Liberal Political Thought ====
Liberal political thought revolves around three core principles, according to Unger:

- The principle of rules and values. This principle holds that value is the social face of desire, referring to something wanted or sought by a person. Rules are necessary to restrain the mutual hostility and antagonism that arises as people pursue their arbitrarily chosen values. The distinction between rules and values as two basic elements of social order is the first principle of liberal social thought, and it stands at the heart of the unreflective liberal belief that the eternal hostility of men to each other requires that order and freedom be maintained by government under law.
- The principle of subjective value. This is the idea that all values are individual and subjective; the individuality of values is the basis of personal identity under liberalism, which does not recognize communal values. Values are subjective, determined by choice, a belief that goes against the ancient conception of objective value. Liberal thought represents a revolt against the conception of objective value.
- The principle of individualism holds that a group is simply a collection of individuals. Formally analogous to the principle of analysis, which maintains that a whole is just the sum of its parts, the principle of individualism implies that society is artificial, that groups, being merely the products of the will and interests of individuals, are less real than the individuals that comprise them. Unger suggests that individualism is so deeply rooted in Western liberal thought that it is hard to grasp the opposite view, the collectivist and organicist view held by romantics. Collectivists view the group as having an independent existence. The heart of the collectivist view is the idea of the spontaneity of social bonds and their priority over individual striving.

==== The Problems of Legislation and Adjudication ====
Unger contends that there can be no coherent theory of legislation or adjudication on liberal premises. Liberal thinkers believe society is held together by rules, so under liberal doctrine issues of legislation and adjudication are central to solving the problems of order and freedom. Unger shows that the problems of order and freedom collapse into each other (to know what standards laws would have to conform to, so as not to prefer arbitrarily one man's advantage over another's, one would also have to know how best to restrain antagonism in the interest of collaboration). Justification of laws, therefore, consists in showing that restraints on freedom are justified and no greater than necessary.

Unger enumerates three main ways that modern political philosophy envisages the establishment of freedom through legislation. The first two, based on formal and substantive theories of freedom, are expressions of liberal doctrine. They have similar flaws that render them incoherent. The formal theory (represented most prominently by Kant) is too abstract to offer concrete guidance on legislation; once we try to derive specificity from its principles, we cannot avoid preferring some values over others. The substantive doctrine (with variations offered by utilitarianism, social contract theory, and Rawls) also fails because it cannot find a neutral way to legislate among individual and competing values. The third basis for legislation, based on a doctrine of shared values, is a partial attempt to escape liberal doctrine, one that does not go far enough. It has the merit of viewing freedom as something other than the liberal concept of freedom to do whatever one wants; freedom, under the doctrine of shared values, is a development of human capacities, talents, and powers, and the task of the state is to choose arrangements that foster this human flourishing. If taken to the hilt, the doctrine of shared values might be a coherent basis for lawmaking. Liberalism has failed to provide such a coherent theory; its attempts to offer one have failed because they could not avoid preferring some values over others, thus violating the demand for neutral laws that is at the heart of liberalism.

Similarly, liberalism has failed to provide a coherent theory of adjudication. Unger describes two ways of ordering human relations under a judicial regime: legal justice and substantive justice. Legal justice establishes rules governing general categories of acts and persons, and settles particular disputes on the basis of the system's rules. Substantive justice determines goals of the system, and then, independent of rules, tries to decide cases by a judgment of which decision will likely contribute to the achievement of the goal, in other words, an exercise of instrumental rationality. In a system of legal justice, there is a possible distinction between legislation and adjudication, although the line may be hazy in some systems (such as under a common law system). In substantive justice regimes, there is no meaningful line between legislation and adjudication.

In his account of the failure of liberalism to provide a coherent account of adjudication, Unger explores the two primary paths that jurists have taken in explaining regimes of legal justice: formalist and purposive accounts. Formalist accounts collapse because they depend upon a theory of plain meaning that can only be accepted if one accepts the doctrine of intelligible essences, which liberalism must reject. A purposive account of legal justice, which holds that judges must consider the purposes and policies of laws they apply, in order to apply them correctly and uniformly, results in judges applying their own subjective preferences, and there is no method of choice among the many policies that may compete for the judge's attention in finding a rationale for decision. Ultimately, purposive adjudication results in the exercise of instrumental rationality, which cannot pretend to have stability or generality, thus it is fatal to the aims of legal justice.

Substantive justice does not offer hope for the liberal seeking a basis for a coherent theory of adjudication. A substantive justice regime, Unger explains, requires common values so firmly established that they can be taken for granted in deciding individual cases. Tribal societies and theocratic states have common values that can provide such a basis for adjudication. But in liberal thought, the centrality of the principles of subjective value and individualism destroy the possibility of a stable set of common ends. Thus, whether liberal doctrine appeals to legal justice or substantive justice in developing a theory of adjudication, it will fail, because the premises of liberalism make all such efforts collapse into incoherence.

==== Shared Values ====
Unger concludes his account of liberal political thought by exploring the idea of shared values as a possible solution to the problem of order and freedom that liberalism failed to solve. Unger sees the concept of shared values as a possible basis for saving formalism, a formalism based on plain meanings that derive from shared social life, not derived from the unsupportable doctrine of intelligible essences. Shared values could also serve as a basis for a regime of substantive justice, in which decisions would be made based on their ability to promote common ends. Rules could have plain meanings because that are backed by a common vision of the world. Unger sees the possibility of shared values, conceived in this way, as requiring group values that are neither individual nor subjective. A system of ideas and social life in which shared values would have this central role would be one in which the distinction between fact and value has been repudiated. But under liberalism, and the social experience that exists in the grip of liberal doctrine, shared values could not have this force. Unger believes shared values have this promise, but that this promise could only be realized under two conditions: the development of a new system of thought, and the occurrence of a political event that transforms the conditions of social life. The theory of organic groups, which he will explore at the end of Knowledge and Politics, describes a setting in which these conditions are satisfied.

=== Chapter 3: The Unity of Liberal Thought ===
Having surveyed liberal psychology and liberal political thought, Unger then undertakes to show the underlying unity of liberal thought, and he seeks to locate the source of this unity in ideas even more fundamental than those discussed in previous chapters.

==== The Methodological Challenge of Studying Liberalism ====
Unger explains that much criticism of liberalism is directed at liberal doctrine only as it exists in the order of ideas, a level of discourse in which one can fruitfully apply the methods and procedures of formal logic. However, a full review of liberalism requires that it be examined not only as it exists in the order of ideas, but also as a form of social life, one that exists in the realm of consciousness. Studying liberalism as it exists in the realm of consciousness is not an inquiry susceptible of formal logical analysis; rather, a different method must be employed, one suited to symbolic analysis. Unger describes the method needed as a method of appositeness or symbolic interpretation.

The method Unger contends is most suited to the examination of liberalism in the realm of consciousness, is one that has been driven to the periphery of intellectual life under liberalism, namely the method of the ancient humanistic, dogmatic disciplines, such as theology, grammar, and legal study. Such method assumes a community of intention between the interpreter and the interpreted. This method of symbolic interpretation has been largely abandoned under liberalism, since liberal principles of subjective value and individualism have destroyed the community of intentions required to make such doctrinal inquiry fruitful.

Unger discusses how studying ideas such as those represented by liberalism can be challenging because ideas can exist in three senses of existence—in the mode of events, in the mode of social life, and in the mode of ideas. An idea can be a psychic event that can be studied by science; a belief wedded to human conduct that is amenable only to a symbolic, interpretive method; and as the content of thought, which can have truth or falsehood and is susceptible to logical analysis. This "stratified ontology," as Unger describes it, leads to some of the most intractable problems of philosophy, especially in understanding the relation of social life to the realms of ideas and events.

Liberalism exists both as a philosophical system and as a type of consciousness that represents and dictates a kind of social life. Explaining that liberalism "is a 'deep structure' of thought, placed at the intersection of two modes of being, liberalism resists a purely logical analysis." Unger makes this foray into methodology as a way of setting the stage for his explanation of the unity of liberalism, and his exploration of what might replace liberalism as a superior conception of culture and society.

==== The Interdependence of Psychological and Political Principles ====
Unger describes how key principles of liberal psychology—the principle of reason and desire and the principle of arbitrary desire—have a reciprocal interdependence with the main principles of liberal political thought, the principle of rules and values and the principle of subjective value. The psychological principles, which apply to the individual, mirror the corresponding political principles that describe society. “Desire” describes the place of individual ends in the self, while “value” describes the place of individual ends in society. Under liberalism, in neither the psychological realm nor the political realm can the understanding guide people to what they ought to desire or value.

A society in which understanding were capable of perceiving or establishing the ends of conduct would look very different from society under a liberal regime of social life. Values would be perceived as objective, they would be shared communally, and rules would no longer be needed as the main social bond. The theories of natural law and natural right, and the communal/organicist view of the romantics, both articulate a vision in which values are communal and evident to all members of society, a very different view from liberal thought which holds that men have no natural guides to the moral life and must be led around by threats and restrained by rules.

Unger explains how the psychological principle of analysis and the political principle of individualism have an identical form and a relationship of reciprocal interdependence. They both stand for the idea that the whole is the sum of its parts. Individualism depends upon the principle of analysis, because it implies that one is able to decompose every aspect of group life into a feature of the lives of individuals. Analysis depends upon individualism, because individualism implies that all phenomena must be treated as aggregations of distinct individuals interacting with each other. But Unger, using the examples of artistic style and consciousness, concludes that analysis and individualism both fail to explain certain phenomena that resist reduction to individual belief and conduct. The concepts of collectivism and totality manage to explain phenomena of consciousness, and these anti-liberal concepts view the authors of these wholes as groups, classes, factions, and nations, not individuals. If we admit that consciousness is real, we must reject the principles of individualism and analysis, as unable to explain much of the world as we experience it. Unger contends that the implications of analytic thinking also give unmerited authority to the fact-value distinction; because the analytic thinker fragments forms of social consciousness, such as dividing beliefs into descriptive and normative beliefs, the analyst gives plausibility to the fact-value distinction which has been part of the damaging legacy of liberal doctrine.

Because principles of analysis and individualism create obstacles for the understanding of mind and science, social theory has sought to escape these limitations and find a method of social study that respects the integrity of social wholes. Unger offers a suggestion of how analytic and individualist ideas can be overthrown, and he explains why some efforts to do so (such as structuralism) have failed. As Unger explained earlier in Knowledge and Politics, analysis and individualism reflect belief in the principle of aggregation, while synthesis and collectivism reflect a belief in totality. Modern social theory has repeatedly tried to formulate a plausible account of the idea of totality; examples of these efforts include Chomsky's linguistic theory, gestalt psychology, structuralism, and Marxism. But these efforts have often stumbled in defining exactly what the difference is between wholes and parts, and exactly what the idea of “part” means if it is something different in kind from the totality. Unger explains that the two main interpretations of the principle of totality are structuralism and realism. Structuralism finds it useful to regard certain things as totalities, but it errs in its conventionalist attitude toward totality; it doubts whether totalities correspond to real things. Realism is a more promising approach to totality because it regards unanalyzable wholes—totalities—as real things. But realism, too, falls short of the mark because it fails to resolve the antinomy of theory and fact.

==== The Antinomies of Liberal Thought Related to the Universal and the Particular ====
Unger concludes his discussion of the unity of liberal thought by discussing the seemingly insoluble antinomies of liberal thought—theory and fact, reason and desire, rules and values—and their connection with the division between the universal and the particular. Under the antinomy of theory and fact, it appears that we can only discuss facts in the language of theory, but at the same time there appears to be some ability to appeal to the facts independently of theory, in order to judge the merits of competing theories. Reason and desire present a similarly intractable conflict; reason can clarify the relations among ends, never what ends we should choose; but falling back on a morality of desire seems to condemn us to action with no standards other than arbitrary choice. The antinomy of rules and values reveals that a system of legal justice or rules cannot dispense with a consideration of values, but also cannot be made consistent with them, and a system of substantive justice (or values) cannot do without rules but also cannot be made consistent with them. Unger contends that we will never resolve these antinomies until we find our way out of the "prison-house of liberal thought."

Unger begins here to suggest the way we might create an alternative doctrine, one that is not bedeviled by the antinomies of liberalism, would be to start with a premise of the unity, or identity, of universals and particulars. Doing this plausibly, would require overcoming the division between ideas and events, reason and desire, rule and value, without denying their separateness, and without rejecting universality and particularity. Overcoming the seemingly intractable antagonism between universality and particularity, which is the source of so much tragedy in life according to Unger, may seem impossible, but Unger points to examples of how this unity can be understood. He maintains that universals must exist as particulars; in the way a person is inseparable from their body but is also more than their body, the universal and particular may represent different levels of reality. Unger contends that a kind of unity between the universal and the particular is evident in moral, artistic, and religious experience, and understanding the basis of this unity is a way past the antinomies of liberal thought. Understanding this unity between the universal and particular sets the stage for Unger's positive theory in Knowledge and Politics.

=== Chapter 4: The Theory of the Welfare-Corporate State ===
In this chapter, Unger expands his view and intends to consider liberal thought in view of its relationship to society. Liberalism, Unger explains, is a representation of a form of life in the language of speculative thought, and gains its unity and richness by being associated with a form of life. We must understand the nature of its association with a form of life in order to complete the task of total criticism.

Unger contends that the underlying mode of social life has been changing in ways that both require a reconstruction of philosophical principles and guide us toward that reconstruction. Unger asserts that "the truth of knowledge and politics is both made and discovered in history."

Every type of social life can be viewed from two complementary perspectives, both informed by the principle of totality: as a form of consciousness, and as a mode of order. Forms of social consciousness cannot be dissolved into constituent parts without a critical loss of understanding; this is the basis for Unger's assertion that the principle of totality governs the explanation of social consciousness.

==== Social Consciousness in the Liberal State ====
Unger sees three major elements of social consciousness in the liberal state as instrumentalism, individualism, and a conception of social place as a role that is external to oneself. Each of these elements of liberal social consciousness are reflections of the ideal of transcendence, which, being opposed to the concept of immanence, originated in the religious concept of a separation between the divine and the mundane, heaven and earth, God and man. The divisions at the heart of liberalism reflect a secularized version of transcendence; liberals abandon the explicitly theological form of religiosity without completely discarding the implicitly religious meaning of the concept.

Liberal consciousness, because it has abandoned the explicitly theological form of transcendence, leads to a seeming paradox: when the divine is secularized, part of the secular world becomes sanctified, which seems to lead to the position of immanence. For this reason, Unger sees liberal social consciousness as a transition between two modes of consciousness: from one in which transcendence is emphasized, to one that reasserts the earlier religious ideal of immanence. This uneasy balance between the pure theological form of transcendence and the affirmation of religious immanence is the basis for the key dichotomies of liberal thought.

==== Social Order in the Liberal State ====
Unger argues that a social order is composed of elements, each defined by their relation to all other elements. The two types of elements are individuals and groups. One's position in the social order is one's social place. The types of social order are distinguished by their principle of order, the rule according to which the elements are arranged.

Each individual lives in a social situation in which one or a few types of social order are dominant. According to Unger, the generative principles of the types of social order are the foremost determinants of how a person defines his identity.

The most familiar principles of social order are kinship, estate, class, and role. Class and role are the most relevant to the social order of the liberal state. When determination of social place is governed by class, one's class membership tends to determine the job one holds. When determination of social place is by role, one's merit is the principle that determines the job one holds. Unger explains that the links between class and role can be so numerous that they appear indistinguishable.

Unger points out that there could be a fundamental opposition between class and role—a role achieved by recognized merit could give access to consumption, power, and knowledge. Class would then become a consequence, not a cause, of role.

Under the systems of kinship, estate, and class, there is a common reliance on personal dependence and personal domination as devices of social organization. By contrast with these earlier systems, the principle of role, at its fullest development, actualizes an ideal that moves away from personal dependence and domination. It embodies the ideal that power in the liberal state should be disciplined by prescriptive, impersonal rules. Power should not be held arbitrarily; in government, those with power must be chosen by election, and in private roles, by merit. Jobs are to be allocated by merit, namely the ability to get job done, by acquired skill, past efforts, and natural talent.

Although the ascendance of role seems to imply the lessening of arbitrary power in society, Unger points out how class survives alongside role, pervading every aspect of social life, and functioning as a permanent refutation of ideal of impersonal roles. Natural talent and genetic gifts are distributed capriciously, and amount to a brute fact of natural advantage that is decisive in allocating power in a society governed by a principle of merit-based role.

Unger concludes that superimposed on the conflict between class and role, there is a pervasive conflict between experience of personal dependency/dominance, and the ideal of organization by impersonal rules, and evidence of these two tensions touches every aspect of life in the liberal state.

==== Bureaucracy as the Master Institution of the Liberal State ====
Unger considers bureaucracy to be the characteristic institution of the liberal state, one that reflects the prevailing kinds of social order that are deep and hidden modes of social organization. Bureaucracy has several key features:

- Bureaucracy is committed to organization by impersonal rules;
- A hierarchy of authority exists among members of the institution;
- Individuals in the institution have roles, specific jobs to do, that are defined in a standardized way;
- There is a pervasive experience of personal dependence and domination.

As a historical institution, bureaucracy developed during the emergence of the European nation-state, when breakup of feudal and postfeudal hierarchies made dependence on rules necessary. As bureaucracy developed, bureaucratic staffs acquired interests of their own. Systems of rules and hierarchy allowed bureaucracies to resist encroachments of rulers and social groups and pretend to be above politics.

Bureaucracy became a characteristic institution of the liberal state because, like the liberal state, bureaucracy exists in context of class organization of society and seems to offer an escape from constraints of class society, by putting impersonal rules in the place of personal dependence. But bureaucracy does not solve the internal conflicts of a class society. The bureaucratic role is not a total social place; the making and applying of rules involves some arbitrary exercise of power; and the implications of the ideal of merit include the fact that merit creates a new class system. A hierarchy of talents succeeds the accident of inherited wealth as an arbitrary determinant of one's fortunes. The bureaucracy, for this reason, cannot solve the problem of personal domination in the liberal state. As Unger puts it, "Men want to be humans but bureaucracy doesn't satisfy their humanity."

==== The Welfare-Corporate State ====
According to Unger, the conflicts within its dominant types of social consciousness and order push the liberal state in the direction of the welfare-corporate state. Unger contends that contemporary capitalist society sees the development of types of social consciousness and social organization that are incompatible with certain traits of the liberal state, creating new problems and perspectives that call out for new concepts and a reconstructed theory of society. Classical social theory was an attempt to understand the liberal state; understanding the welfare-corporate state demands that we transform the substance and methods of the study of society.

Classic social theory fails in part because it continues to rely upon extensive elements of liberal doctrine, and fails to advance from partial to total criticism. The emergent welfare-corporate state transforms the experience of social life and calls for a nonliberal system of thought. Although the conception of a second stage of liberal capitalist society is a familiar one, its identity remains elusive. Its features are commonly described to include the following:

- It is a state where government assumes widespread overt responsibility for distribution of economic and market advantages.
- It is a state where bodies intermediate between individual and government achieve a larger place in society (reflecting a welfare and corporatist tendency to break down distinction between government and civil society).
- It includes an emphasis on the transformation of nature, a prominent role for technology, and there is a preeminent bureaucratic class who direct the state's welfare activities.

But it is necessary to describe the social consciousness that would establish the identity of the welfare-corporate state. The welfare-corporate state appears with the emergence of a certain type of consciousness and of social order. Such consciousness was foreshadowed by ideas that were marginal at the height of liberal social consciousness, namely the romantic worship of nature, the invocation of hierarchical and egalitarian ideals of community, and a repudiation of a division of labor. As society transitions to a welfare-corporate state, those ideas move from a visionary elite to be widely embraced by a broader class of people who hold bureaucratic, technical and professional roles.

As this transformed social consciousness takes hold, key aspects of liberal social consciousness are rejected. The emergent consciousness is hostile to a manipulative posture toward society, believing that order will develop spontaneously and should not be imposed. There's an emphasis on decentralization and de-bureaucratization, increased interest in preservation, an embrace of nature and a reassertion of mystic religiosity. Individualism is rejected, replaced by more interest in solidarity and a desire for non-hierarchical communities. The new social consciousness of the welfare-corporate state rebels against the liberal conception of work and social place, rejecting the traditional division of labor and demanding that jobs represent the vitality and range of the self.

All of these changes in social consciousness that appear in the transition to the welfare-corporate state represent the rise of immanence as an ideal. Like the secularized transcendence of liberalism, the immanence that emerges is a secularized immanence.

Unger sees both the welfare-corporate state, and the socialist state, as providing the seeds of a solution to problem of the divisions at the heart of liberalism. The philosophy that is needed to transcend the antinomies of liberalism is one that would offer a union of immanence and transcendence and make possible the achievement of egalitarian community.

=== Chapter 5: The Theory of the Self ===
In this chapter, Unger states a metaphysical conception of the self. He intends to demonstrate the relationship between certain aspects of human nature and lay the groundwork for a definition of the social ideal. He describes familiar attributes of humanity that are central to our ideas of personality and society, and he infers from these attributes a more general view of the relation between self and world.

Unger has already shown, through his discussion of the antinomies of liberal thought, that liberal doctrine fails to provide a coherent view of knowledge, personality, and society. This leads to two questions:

1. Where can we find a solid ground on which to establish an alternative set of principles and fulfill the task of total criticism?
2. Both the welfare-corporate state and the socialist state seem to have a double nature. What are we to make of this duality, and how can we resolve it favorably?

These questions suggest a possible synthesis of immanence and transcendence, and they also suggest an actualization of nonhierarchical community in social life.

For Unger, the criticism of liberal thought implies an idea of personality and an idea of community. The ideas of personality and community contain each other; to some extent the self is the personification of mankind.

==== Requirements of an Adequate Theory of the Self ====
According to Unger, three topics have dominated the study of human nature in Western culture, and there are two main positions on each topic.

- The problem of the connection between human nature and history: One view, the suprahistorical view, holds that human beings are condemned to in an iron circle of virtues and vices; the other, the historicist view, holds that there are as many human natures as there are societies or even individuals.
- The problem of essentialist versus relational view of human nature: One view is that there is an essential core to human nature, a view related to the doctrine of intelligible essences; and the other view is that human nature is relational and can change with historical context.
- The problem of the relation between individual humans and their species: One view holds that the individual is a mere example of his species (a view asserting the primacy of species nature), and the other view reduces the species to a category of classification and holds that individual nature has primacy.

An adequate view of human nature, Unger believes, must avoid the defects of all six positions. His view is that human nature is a universal that exists through its particular embodiments. Each person, each culture, is a novel interpretation of humanity.

==== Method of Exposition and Proof ====
Unger sees a person's life as operating in three theaters: (1) the person's relationship to nature, (2) the person's relation to other persons, and (3) the person's relation to his or her own work and station.

In each theater we face certain recurring problems arising from the most basic demands we place on nature, others, or ourselves. These demands define the meaning of humanity. One can identify them through some commonplace ideas we have about human nature. When we put them together, Unger claims, they form a vision foreign to liberal doctrine that is capable of replacing it.

Unger sees his doctrine of the self as promising because it answers two major questions about human life, one historical and the other metaphysical. First, it answers a historical question: it allows us to clarify the antagonistic trends we have found within the welfare-corporate and socialist state, and explains the historical alternation between immanence and transcendence in social consciousness. Second, it helps answers the question of what men are and what men ought to be, by drawing upon the ideas contained in our everyday judgments, our moral intuitions, and our present ways of speaking about human life, all of which offer a more complete picture of humanity than that allowed by liberal premises.

Unger acknowledges that the answers to both the historical and the metaphysical questions are problematic, in that our theory shapes our interpretation of history, and it can be difficult to know what aspects of our experience, intuitions, and everyday judgments to accept or reject. Unger does not consider these problems fatal to his ambition to find a persuasive theory of the self: we may find that the number of plausible accounts of human nature is extremely limited, and our inability to confirm which account is true may simply point to the fact that human nature contains different possibilities.

==== The Nature of the Self ====
Unger sees the first two attributes of the self as consciousness and indeterminacy. Consciousness is experienced as the self's distance from the world, and the self's indeterminacy is based on the limited hold of natural instincts over human will. Consciousness is the mark of man's subjective separation from the world, and indeterminacy is the mark of man's objective separation from the world. According to Unger, these two attributes of self mean that man has no predetermined place in nature, and therefore it is the human task to make a place for himself. Unger sees the problem to be solved by a theory of the self as a twofold one: man needs to preserve his independence from the outside world, while also living in a world that is transparent to the mind. To achieve these things is to achieve what Unger calls "natural harmony."

There are two ways that natural harmony can be achieved, according to Unger:

- Reconciliation with the nonhuman world
- Realizing harmony in day-to-day life

The principal way of achieving natural harmony in one's life is through work, which allows us to join the human and the nonhuman world. Works combine features of natural objects with geometrical objects: works embody qualities of natural objects to the extent that they are embodied, tangible things; but also have qualities of geometrical objects in that they are products of the human intelligence and thus, in principle, can be known perfectly to the extent that they represent the intention of the maker.

In addition to trying to achieve harmony with the nonhuman world, man also endeavors to achieve harmony with other people. This involves striving to realize the ideal of sympathy, which in Unger's view combines the greatest degree of individuality with the greatest sociability. This ideal, which represents the highest reconciliation of the self with others, can only be achieved, Unger argues, in groups that are both small and represent a "universalized" association, or in other words, an association that gives the fullest expression and fulfillment to the various aspects of mankind's species nature. Such an association would offer the possibility of achieving the "concrete universality" that, in Unger's view, is the best chance of surmounting the fatal divisions of liberal theory.

==== How the Theory of the Self Points Toward a Solution to the Dilemmas of Liberal Doctrine ====
The three aspects of Unger's ideal of the self—natural harmony (reconciliation with nature), sympathy (reconciliation with fellow man), and concrete universality (reconciliation with oneself)—would move us past the mode of division in which liberal doctrine traps us, if they can be actualized. These three aspects of the ideal describe a hypothetical ideal circumstance for human beings, according to Unger.

Unger contends that this theory of self solves two central problems with which Knowledge and Politics is concerned: first, it offers an outline of an alternative to liberalism (and its metaphysical emphasis on transcendence) and also to the antitheses of liberalism, the various systems emphasizing immanence (principally, the welfare-corporate state and socialism). Second, it offers a new way of understanding the situation of modern society.

Unger believes the elements of a synthesis of transcendence and immanence are already present in contemporary society. To seize upon these elements and develop them to their fullest potential as the basis for community, according to Unger, is to find a political solution to the problem of the self. It is this task he turns to in the next and final chapter, on the theory of organic groups.

=== Chapter 6: The Theory of Organic Groups ===
There are two dangers that we encounter in our attempts to realize the ideal of the self, Unger explains: idolatry (represented by immanence) and utopianism (represented by transcendence). Unger's theory of organic groups shows how the ideal of self can avoid these dangers through the transformation of the welfare-corporate and socialist states. The theory of organic groups, Unger writes, “vindicates hope against resignation and disintegration.”

A major difficulty that the theory of organic groups encounters is how we can affirm an idea of the good in the face of the principle of subjective value. We need an account of the good that bypasses the dual problem of, on the one hand, the subjective concept of value and, on the other hand, the objective concept of value. The theory of the self underlying the theory of organic groups does this, by offering an account of the good that sees it as consisting in the manifestation and development of a universal human nature.

This account of the good has two main elements: an elaboration of the “species nature” of mankind, and an explanation of the spiral of increasing community. Unger's conception of the species nature of mankind does not rely on a doctrine of intelligible essences or an unchanging core in human beings. Rather, this species nature develops in history.

This account of the species nature of mankind of complemented by Unger's notion of the spiral of consensus that could first eradicate the evil of domination, and second, help develop community. Priority must be given to overcoming domination before focusing on developing community.

The organic group as Unger sketches it would provide an institution reflecting sympathetic social relations on three levels: it would be a community of life, reflecting the ideal of sympathy, a democracy of ends, reflecting shared values, and it would embody a division of labor that supports natural harmony, sympathy, and concrete universality. The central conception of the theory of organic groups is this ideal of universal community.

Although the problems occasioned by the conflict of immanent order and transcendence can never fully be reconciled, and the spiral of domination and community seeks an end it cannot fully achieve, Unger sees this ideal as a regulative ideal that translates into political possibility many key elements of sympathetic social relations.

The organic group, as Unger envisions it, would gradually replace meritocratic power by democratic power in the institutions of society and in occupational groups. Politics would be "the master principle of everyday life." The organic group would diminish natural talent in allocating power, instead viewing hierarchy as a political choice, not as a given.

The standards of choice to be used by the organic group would include the experience of other groups, as well as the good of the community. The organic group's approach to distributive justice would, in the beginning, use standards both of productive effort and the standard of need, but as the organic group progresses it could refine its standard with more accurate knowledge of the true content of the idea of need.

Unger's proposal envisions organic groups proliferating throughout society. Their proliferation would help avert any danger to individuality, by making all of life subject to public discourse and political choice.

The division of labor in the organic group would be one that expresses the concrete universality of each of the group's members: according to Unger, "allocation of tasks should allow each individual to develop his unique dispositions so as to serve and express values or practices whose legitimacy as signs of species nature he can recognize." The individual should not be confined to one narrow role, but should be afforded the chance to experiment with various forms of social life so as to possibly transcend his place in the social order. Specialization in the organic group needs to be "tempered, but not abolished," according to Unger.

Unger sees the theory of organic group as undergirded by a respect and defense of the individual, represented by three institutional principles: (1) Freedom of joining or leaving groups in the community of life; (2) Freedom to express ideas; and (3) Liberty of work.

One of the paradoxes of human existence, which will never fully be solved, is that community "needs to remain a particular group, yet become a universal one." This reflects the same irreducibility of the universal and particular that is found throughout human life.

Unger leaves many questions about organic groups unanswered: (1) what powers should organic groups have over their members, (2) how should groups be ordered among themselves, (3) what is the relation between intragroup solidarity and intergroup concord? (4) what is the significance of the imperfection of community?

Unger's view, the virtue of politics practiced in the manner he proposes, "is to make the ideal of the self into a form of social life." The doctrine of organic groups "describes the construction of a society in which the ideal is no longer confined to the dreams and diversions of private life, but has permeated the world of work and changed the character of social relations."

== Reception ==
Jerome Neu, writing in the Texas Law Review, lauded Knowledge and Politics as "breathtaking in its sweep, impressive in its erudition, and vast in its ambitions.... The book is remarkable both for how much it undertakes and how much it achieves." Neu identified some weaknesses in the book, contending that while "Unger's succinct survey of positions in legal theory and their interconnections is illuminating, I think it may oversimplify matters." Further, Neu applauded the tight organization of the book, but allowed that "[w]hile Unger's architectonic gives structure to his argument, it (like Kant's) sometimes makes things more complicated than necessary." Neu also took issue with Unger's account of the interconnections between the basic principles of liberal psychology and liberal political theory, arguing that "the nature of the interconnection is somewhat obscure because it varies from points to point and cannot be covered in the general manner attempted by Unger." Overall, Neu gave high praise to Knowledge and Politics, writing, "I fear that I may not have properly conveyed a sense of the book's richness of texture .... In all, the book is controlled and informed, and affords a brilliant display of the synthesizing and speculative philosophical intelligence at work.".

Karsten Harries, writing in the Yale Law Journal, offered a more skeptical assessment of the merits of Knowledge and Politics. Harries took issue with Unger's claim to be engaging in "total criticism" of liberalism, contending that Unger actually offers "a challenging partial critique of premises we too often take for granted." Harries also argues that Unger is incorrect in asserting that the affirmation of intelligible essences or objective values is inconsistent with liberal thought. Harries concludes his assessment by expressing "serious doubts concerning Unger's critique of the liberal position."

Reviewing the book for the Fordham Law Review, David A.J. Richards contended that "Unger's substantive moral conception is ... inadequately explained and explicated. Insofar as one can understand the substantive nature of his moral ideal, however, it seems deeply flawed, and indeed itself morally indefensible." Describing Unger's moral theory in Knowledge and Politics as "Platonic and Marxist," Richards identified in the book an "organic analogy" between the state and a "complete, fully developed, and abundant human self." According to Richards, "[o]rganic analogies, whether in Plato, Marx, or Unger, are intrinsically totalitatian.". Richards went on to say that "Unger's theory, like Marx's, fundamentally misconstrues the ideals of political, social, and economic justice on the model of personal love." Richards concluded his review by speculating that behind Knowledge and Politics "lies a kind of poetic reverie for a lost love or childhood, which theory now apocalyptically validates."

== Sources ==
- Abraham, Kenneth S. (December 1979). "Review of Knowledge and Politics and Law in Modern Society by Roberto Mangabeira Unger". MLN. 94 (5: Comparative Literature): 1202–1206. doi:10.2307/2906575. JSTOR 2906575.
- Harries, Karsten (May 1976). "The Contradictions of Liberal Thought (review of Knowledge and Politics by Roberto Mangabeira Unger)". The Yale Law Journal. 85 (6). The Yale Law Journal Company, Inc.: 847–854. doi:10.2307/795722. JSTOR 795722.
- Kronman, Anthony (1976–1977). "Book Review: Knowledge and Politics by Roberto Mangabeira Unger". Minnesota Law Review. 61: 167. doi:10.24926/265535.1749.
- Leff, Arthur Allen (1978). "Memorandum (review of Knowledge and Politics by Roberto Mangabeira Unger)". Stanford Law Review. 29: 879–889. doi:10.2307/1228264. JSTOR 1228264.
- Neu, Jerome (1976). "Unger's Knowledge and Politics". Texas Law Review. 54: 441–458.
- Noonan, Jr., John T. (1976). "Book Review: Knowledge and Politics by Roberto Mangabeira Unger". American Journal of Jurisprudence. 21: 194–199. doi:10.1093/ajj/21.1.194.
- Richards, David A. J. (1976). "Review of Knowledge and Politics by Roberto Mangabeira Unger". Fordham Law Review. 44 (4): 873.
- Rorty, Richard (Fall 1976). "Review of On Human Conduct by Michael Oakeshott and Knowledge and Politics by Roberto Mangabeira Unger". Social Theory and Practice. 4 (1): 107–115. doi:10.5840/soctheorpract1976417. JSTOR 23557761.
- Roy, Don (Fall 1979). "Review of Knowledge and Politics by Roberto Mangabeira Unger". The Political Science Reviewer. 9. Hampden-Sydney, Va.: 103.
- Soper, Philip (1976–1977). "Book Review: Knowledge and Politics by Roberto Mangabeira Unger". Michigan Law Review. 75: 1539–1552. doi:10.2307/1287810. JSTOR 1287810.
- Thigpen, Robert B.; Downing, Lyle A. (November 1976). "Review of Knowledge and Politics by Roberto Mangabeira Unger". The Journal of Politics. 38 (4). The University of Chicago Press on behalf of the Southern Political Science Association: 1056–1058. doi:10.2307/2129516. JSTOR 2129516.
- Unger, Roberto Mangabeira (1975). Knowledge and Politics. New York: The Free Press. ISBN 0-02-932840-3.
- Yacavone, John (1978). "Review of Knowledge and Politics by Roberto Mangabeira Unger". Boston University Law Review. 58: 325–335.
