= The Critical Legal Studies Movement =

- Author: Roberto Mangabeira Unger
- Language: English
- Subject: Philosophy
- Publisher: 1986 (Harvard University Press); 2015 (Verso Books)
- Publication place: United States
- Pages: 224
- ISBN: 978-1-78168-339-2
- LC Class: K230.U56C755 2015
- Preceded by: Passion: An Essay on Personality
- Followed by: Politics: A Work In Constructive Social Theory

The Critical Legal Studies Movement is a book by the philosopher and politician Roberto Mangabeira Unger. First published in 1983 as an article in the Harvard Law Review, published in book form in 1986, and reissued with a new introduction in 2015, The Critical Legal Studies Movement is a principal document of the American critical legal studies movement that supplied the book with its title. In the book, Unger argues that law and legal thought offers unrealized possibilities for the self-construction of a more democratic society, and that many lawyers and legal theorists have uncritically surrendered to constraints that undermine their ability to make use of law's transformative potential. Unger explains how the critical legal studies movement has refined and reformulated the major themes of leftist and progressive legal theorists, namely the critique of formalism and objectivism in legal doctrine, and the purely instrumental use of legal practice and doctrine to advance leftist aims, and in doing so, has identified elements of a constructive program for the reconstruction of society.

== Overview ==
Unger sets out to show how contemporary theories of law and society have been constrained by the false belief that law is a necessary expression of certain abstract ideas of social organization, such as democracy or market economy. Unger contends that these modes of social organization do not have any natural, necessary, or inevitable form. Unger begins The Critical Legal Studies Movement by critiquing formalism and objectivism, the ideas that he believes lie at the root of the necessitarian thinking that blinds us to law's transformative and constructive potential and possibilities. Formalism is the belief that lawmaking differs fundamentally from law application. Objectivism is the belief that authoritative legal materials (statues, cases, accepted legal ideas) embody and sustain a defensible scheme of human association and display an intelligible moral order.

=== Chapter 1: The Criticism of Legal Thought ===
Unger suggests that applying "extreme criticism" to formalist and objectivist ideas will expose the elements of a constructive program for the reconstruction of society in line with leftist aims. In this chapter, he sets forth critiques of objectivism and formalism. His critique of objectivism aims to show that there is no built-in legal structure for a social organization, and that democracy and the market do not have a universal legal language. His attack on formalism shows that existing legal theories claim to achieve "sanctification of the actual"—that is, these theories claim that substantive law and doctrine just happens to coincide with a coherent normative theory about human conduct. Unger explains that such legal analysis is, in reality, pieced together by an endless process of ad hoc adjustments.

Unger explains that the turning point for many critical legal theorists was when they decided to pursue the critical attack on formalism and objectivism to the hilt, at grave risk of "confusion, paralysis, and marginality."

=== Chapter 2: From Critique to Construction ===
In this chapter, Unger sets forth the constructive outcome of the critiques of formalism and objectivism, namely the practice of "deviationist doctrine" (also called "expanded doctrine"), and the search for alternative institutional forms for basic social institutions, particularly the market and democracy.

Deviationist doctrine, according to Unger, represents an attempt to bridge doctrine with empirical social theory and ideological conflict. Such an expanded form of doctrine fights over the terms of social life, and refuses to accept that established forms of society reflect any practical or psychological necessities. Everything is up for grabs. Such doctrine aims to point out how biased, power-ridden and makeshift legal materials have gained a semblance of necessity that they should not be granted. In brief, deviationist doctrine encourages theorists to transform society by taking an ideal from one part of social life, and extending it into an area from which it had previously been excluded. This has the advantage of allowing the theorist to draw upon a rich collective history of ideas and institutions that have helped to articulate the ideal in the past, and can now be marshaled to defend its extension into a new area of social life.

The search for alternative forms of basic social organization aims to shape social institutions to be more hospitable and nurturing to the context-transcending nature of human beings. Unger characterizes this search as "the quest for a social world that can better do justice to a being whose most remarkable quality is precisely the power to overcome and revise, with time, every social or mental structure in which he moves." Unger sees this effort as defensible because it pushes the preconceptions of liberal legal and political theory to their natural conclusions.

Unger sketches the various features that the institutional program he proposes should have:

- The program would transform relations between people, a transformation of social life that has been prefigured in the literary and philosophical achievements of 20th century modernism. Under this program, personal relationships would be liberated from the background of social division and hierarchy that has haunted mankind throughout history. Until now, the processes of cultural revolution have been cut off from the struggle over the structure of society.
- The program would represent an "empowered democracy". Unger points out how existing democracies do not even satisfy the minimal core of the democratic ideal, and he identifies ways to surmount obstacles to empowered democracy.
- Government should be reorganized to restrain the state without paralyzing its transformative capabilities. The devices that restrain the state in contemporary democracies also serve to deadlock the state.
- The established market system should be destabilized to allow greater access to capital by all, which would disentrench the elites who, by monopolizing privilege, discourage experimentation and hinder economic progress.
- New rights should be recognized, rights that would protect the interests of all members of society and ensure their ability to participate fully in the political, economic, and moral life of their society. These rights would include immunity rights, destabilization rights, market rights, and solidarity rights.
- The program could be summed up as expressing a "superliberalism"—making social life resemble, to some extent, what politics are already like in liberal democracies.

=== Chapter 3: Two Models of Doctrine ===
In this section, Unger proposes the transformation of existing doctrine that would help to advance the aims of the critical legal studies movement. First, he explains how the ambitions underlying equal protection doctrine could better be achieved by expanding this doctrine so that individuals and institutions are vested with "destabilization rights"—that is, the right to disentrench accumulations of power that serve to inhibit and disempower members of society. Second, he proposes to change the social institutions of contract and property to bring them more in line with principles of solidarity and community.

=== Chapter 4: Underlying Conceptions and Broader Implications ===
In this chapter, Unger addresses two plausible objections to the program of critical legal studies and offers his response to them. The objections are, in turn, that it seems merely an accident that we find ourselves in a situation in which we are engaged in the "internal development" of a program such as the one Unger describes, and thus such a program would seem to have no intrinsic authority, since just as easily we could have found ourselves developing a program that leads in another direction. The second plausible objection is that any tradition is inherently ambiguous, and equally compelling arguments could be made for developing the tradition of leftist movements in some other direction.

Unger contends that the program he sets forth is one that has the best chance of harnessing the "negative capability" of human beings—that is, teaching the person "to move within contexts with the dignity of a context-transcending agent." Such a world would be one that more fully reconciles the conflict, felt in every person's life, between the need for self-assertion among other people, and the need to be protected from other people. Furthermore, against the claim that tradition is ambiguous and could be developed in some other direction, Unger argues that his program offers the best chance for making freedom concrete for human beings. Such a program seeks to narrow the gap between our vast transcending capabilities, and the limiting structures in which we live.

=== Chapter 5: Another Politics ===
Unger concludes The Critical Legal Studies Movement by describing how his program offers the opportunity to fuse the revolution in the sphere of personal relations, with a revolution in the uses of government power and institutional structure. The transformative activity that he urges would take place in several settings: in contributing substantive ideas to the project of a democratic remaking of social life; in the transformation of professional technique in all areas of professional expertise, so that there is less gap between activities that leave social structures unchallenged, and activities that call structures into question, and so that the gap between laymen and professionals begins to wane; and finally, in the setting of law schools, where, by penetrating the specialized study of law, the ideas Unger sets forth have the greatest chance of taking root so that they spread throughout society.

== Reception ==
Reviewing the book for The New York Times, Calvin Woodard described The Critical Legal Studies Movement as an "ambitious and impressive undertaking. It also defies summation. It is a carefully crafted statement with ideas interlocked like a chain-link fence that stretches as far as the eye can see." The central theme of the movement, Woodard explained, is

to remove the constraints and hindrances imposed on individuals by unjust social hierarchy and class, enabling them to develop a new sense of self and to give full and free expression to their innate intelligence and imagination. To Mr. Unger, liberated individuals endowed with dignity, self-respect and equal opportunity are the highest hope of humankind. Collectively, a society of such people would make up a new form of empowered democracy in which all social decisions would be regarded as political ones...

Woodard gave high praise to The Critical Legal Studies Movement, stating that "[w]hether one agrees with Mr. Unger and C.L.S. or not, one cannot fail to be impressed by his high idealism and intelligence," but that "I suspect it will be read mostly by the converted and others will not bother. As a result, a whole generation of older readers will miss out on a book that very probably will have enormous influence on the younger generation of law students."
