= Kant's antinomies =

Philosophical contradictions of Immanuel Kant

- Read Beck's article Antinomy of Pure Reason: in the Dictionary of the History of Ideas Vol. I (1973); Here

The antinomies, from the Critique of Pure Reason, are contradictions which Immanuel Kant argued follow necessarily from our attempts to cognize the nature of transcendent reality by means of pure reason.

Kant thought that some certain antinomies of his (God and Freedom) could be resolved as "Postulates of Practical Reason". He used them to describe the equally rational-but-contradictory results of applying the universe of pure thought to the categories or criteria, i.e. applying reason proper to the universe of sensible perception or experience (phenomena). Empirical reason cannot here play the role of establishing rational truths because it goes beyond possible experience and is applied to the sphere of that which transcends it.

The scholar Lewis White Beck suggests that Kant's development of the antinomies may have been influenced by the antinomic mode of argument employed by the ancient Greek philosopher Zeno. In Beck's view, by adopting such a "skeptical method", Kant could avoid the pitfalls of attempting to resolve a conflict between opposing philosophical arguments by asserting instead that the legitimacy of the argument itself may be called into question. Through the use of such a skeptical methodology, Kant could establish the foundation for his claim that "the world we experience is not and does not contain a thing in itself but is only phenomenal." In addition, Beck also argued that Kant's resolution of the "mathematical" antinomy of space and time illustrates his utilization of a philosophical "strategy" which incorporates Ramsey's Maxim.

== Overview ==
Kant's antinomies are four: two "mathematical" and two "dynamical". They are connected with (1) the limitation of the universe in respect of space and time, (2) the theory that the whole consists of indivisible atoms (whereas, in fact, none such exist), (3) the problem of free will in relation to universal causality, and (4) the existence of a necessary being.

The first two antinomies are dubbed "mathematical" antinomies, presumably because in each case we are concerned with the relation between what are alleged to be sensible objects (either the world itself, or objects in it) and space and time. The second two are dubbed "dynamical" antinomies, presumably because the proponents of the thesis are not committing themselves solely to claims about spatio-temporal objects.

== The mathematical antinomies ==
=== The first antinomy (of space and time) ===
- Thesis:
  - The world has a beginning in time, and is also limited as regards space.
- Anti-thesis:
  - The world has no beginning, and no limits in space; it is infinite as regards both time and space.

=== The second antinomy (of atomism) ===
- Thesis:
  - Every composite substance in the world is made up of simple parts, and nothing anywhere exists save the simple or what is composed of the simple.
- Anti-thesis:
  - No composite thing in the world is made up of simple parts, and there nowhere exists in the world anything simple.

== The dynamical antinomies ==
=== The third antinomy (of spontaneity and causal determinism) ===
- Thesis:
  - Causality in accordance with laws of nature is not the only causality from which the appearances of the world can one and all be derived. To explain these appearances it is necessary to assume that there is also another causality, that of Spontaneity.
- Anti-thesis:
  - There is no Spontaneity; everything in the world takes place solely in accordance with laws of nature.

=== The fourth antinomy (of necessary being or not) ===
- Thesis:
  - There belongs to the world, either as its part or as its cause, a being that is absolutely necessary.
- Anti-thesis:
  - An absolutely necessary being nowhere exists in the world, nor does it exist outside the world as its cause.
