= Performative contradiction =

Concept in logic

A performative contradiction (German: performativer Widerspruch) arises when the making of an utterance rests on necessary presuppositions that contradict the proposition asserted in the utterance.

The term was coined by Jürgen Habermas and Karl-Otto Apel, who attribute the first elaboration of the concept to Jaakko Hintikka, in his analysis of Descartes' cogito ergo sum argument. Hintikka concluded that cogito ergo sum relies on performance rather than logical inference.

Habermas claims that post-modernism's epistemological relativism suffers from a performative contradiction. Hans-Hermann Hoppe claims in his theory of discourse ethics that arguing against self-ownership results in a performative contradiction.

== See also ==
- Liar paradox
- Performative utterance
- Self-refuting idea
- Kettle logic – Using inconsistent arguments
