= Kettle logic =

Using inconsistent arguments

Kettle logic (French: la logique du chaudron) is a rhetorical device wherein one uses multiple arguments to defend a point, but the arguments are inconsistent with each other.

Jacques Derrida uses this expression in reference to the humorous "kettle story" related by Sigmund Freud in The Interpretation of Dreams (1900) and Jokes and Their Relation to the Unconscious (1905).

== Philosophy and psychoanalysis ==
The name logique du chaudron comes from Jacques Derrida from an example used by Sigmund Freud for the analysis of "Irma's dream" in The Interpretation of Dreams and in his Jokes and Their Relation to the Unconscious.

Freud relates the story of a man who was accused by his neighbour of having returned a kettle in a damaged condition and the three arguments he offers.

1. That he had returned the kettle undamaged
2. That it was already damaged when he borrowed it
3. That he had never borrowed it in the first place

Though the three arguments are inconsistent, Freud notes that it is so much the better, as if even one is found to be true then the man must be acquitted.

The kettle "logic" of the dream-work is related to what Freud calls the embarrassment-dream of being naked, in which contradictory opposites are yoked together in the dream. Freud said that in a dream, incompatible (contradictory) ideas are simultaneously admitted.

== See also ==
- Dilemma
- Alternative pleading: some forms constitute legal use of kettle logic
- Argument in the alternative
- List of fallacies
- Performative contradiction – Concept in logic
