= Alternative pleading =

Arguing multiple possibilities that may be mutually exclusive

In the law of the United States, alternative pleading (or pleading in the alternative) is the legal term for a form of pleading that permits a party in a court action to argue multiple possibilities that may be mutually exclusive by making use of legal fiction.

A pleading in the alternative sets forth multiple claims or defenses either hypothetically or alternatively, such that if one of the claims or defenses are held invalid or insufficient, the other claims or defenses should still have to be answered.

== Description ==
One example is submitting an injury complaint alleging that the harm to the plaintiff caused by the defendant was so outrageous that it must have either been intended as a malicious attack or, if not, must have been due to gross negligence.

At a late 1970s American Bar Association seminar in New York, Richard "Racehorse" Haynes gave this example: "Say you sue me because you say my dog bit you. Well, now this is my defense: My dog doesn't bite. And second, in the alternative, my dog was tied up that night. And third, I don't believe you really got bit. And fourth, I don't have a dog." Normally such arguments would seem to cancel each other on their face; however, legally "even if" and "anyway" clauses need not be argued; mutually exclusive defenses can be advanced without excuses for their relationship to each other. Of course jurors might be influenced by dual defenses such as "my dog was tied up" and "I don't have a dog", but this must be weighed against the fact that defenses may not be allowed if they are introduced too late.

When alternative pleading is logically inconsistent, it constitutes kettle logic.

== Civil law ==
The United States Federal Rule of Civil Procedure 8(d)(2) states that "[a] party may set out 2 or more statements of a claim or defense alternatively or hypothetically, either in a single count or defense or in separate ones. If a party makes alternative statements, the pleading is sufficient if any one of them is sufficient."

This has been explained as being intended to accommodate "alternative theories" in cases where "the exact nature of the facts is in doubt" or the pleading party "does not know which of the alternatives is true or can be established by the evidence." However, this does not mean inconsistent statements can be given for facts within a party's knowledge.

In New Jersey, pleading inconsistent facts in the alternative may not be used as an admission against that party.

=== England and Wales ===
In the courts of England and Wales, under the Civil Procedure Rules (CPR), a party is required to sign a statement of truth to verify facts in the case. Citing the CPR, a trial court rejected an amendment giving a new version of the pleading that was contradictory to the original. However, the Court of Appeal of England and Wales disagreed and found that the purpose of Part 22 of the CPR is not to "exclude the possibility of pleading inconsistent factual alternatives".

== Criminal law ==
Because pleading in the alternative is generally permitted in criminal cases, a defendant may claim to have not committed the crime itself, but at the same time may claim that if the defendant had committed the crime, the act was excused for a reason such as insanity or intoxication, or was justified due to provocation or self defense. However, a jury will naturally be suspicious if a defendant claims the benefits of, for example, both alibi and self defense. [defendant might reasonably present an alibi and an argument that whoever is in the blurry CCTV footage appears to be in self defense]

Conversely, if the prosecutor puts forth alternative facts which are inconsistent with each other, the inconsistency may present confusion to the jury during deliberation of the verdict in term of the requirements of being unanimous. For example, the Constitution of Oregon requires that the guilty verdict of a first-degree murder must be unanimous. In State v. Zweigart, 344 Or. 619 (Or. 2008), the Oregon Supreme Court held that "a jury must agree, not only that a defendant is guilty of a crime, but also on all the facts material to prove the crime." This means the jury would not be allowed to have half of the jurors using one set of facts and the other half using another even if all of them agree that the defendant is guilty.

== See also ==
- Argument in the alternative
- Kettle logic
