= Paradigm case argument =

Argument in philosophy that a term has a definition when used to define things

In analytic philosophy, the paradigm case argument (PCA) is an argument which is applied as a rebuttal to the claim that certain concepts, such as free will or knowledge, are meaningless. The paradigm case argument is that if a term, such as "knowledge", is regularly applied to some cases and not to others, then that term (and the concept it refers to) cannot truly be undefined, as it clearly has some kind of definition in practice. The argument is so named because it often takes the form of pointing out a paradigm case—a case which unambiguously falls under the common definition of the term, and so can be taken as a definite instance of the supposedly non-existent concept. This argument was commonly applied during the flourishing of linguistic philosophy.

Ian Hacking was critical of the argument structure, describing it as follows:

some British philosophers invented a happily short-lived "paradigm-case argument," so named, I think, in 1957. It was much discussed, for it seemed to be a new and general argument against various kinds of philosophical skepticism. Here is a fair parody of the idea. You cannot claim we lack free will (for example), because we had to learn the use of the expression "free will" from examples, and they are the paradigms. Since we learned the expression from the paradigms, which exist, free will exists.

The argument has fallen from favour. Hacking wrote, "The authoritative Encyclopedia of Philosophy (1967) devoted six careful and informative pages to the paradigm-case argument... The argument has now disappeared from sight. The current online Stanford Encyclopedia of Philosophy does not mention it by name anywhere in its truly encyclopedic pages."

== See also ==
- Ontological argument
