= Self-refuting idea =

Idea that refutes itself

A self-refuting idea or self-defeating idea is an idea or statement whose falsehood is a logical consequence of the act or situation of holding them to be true. Many ideas are called self-refuting by their detractors, and such accusations are therefore almost always controversial, with defenders stating that the idea is being misunderstood or that the argument is invalid. For these reasons, none of the ideas below are unambiguously or incontrovertibly self-refuting. These ideas are often used as axioms, which are definitions taken to be true (tautological assumptions), and cannot be used to test themselves, for doing so would lead to only two consequences: consistency (circular reasoning) or exception (self-contradiction).

== Variations ==
=== Directly self-denying statements ===
Directly self-denying statements are characterised by being necessarily (or inherently) false. The Epimenides paradox is a statement of the form "this statement is false". Such statements troubled philosophers, especially when there was a serious attempt to formalize the foundations of logic. Bertrand Russell developed his "Theory of Types" to formalize a set of rules that would prevent such statements (more formally Russell's paradox) being made in symbolic logic. This work has led to the modern formulation of axiomatic set theory. While Russell's formalization did not contain such paradoxes, Kurt Gödel showed that it must contain independent statements. Any logical system that is rich enough to contain elementary arithmetic contains at least one proposition whose interpretation is this proposition is unprovable (from within the logical system concerned), and hence no such system can be both complete and consistent.

=== Indirectly self-denying statements ===
One form of an indirect self-denying statement is the "Stolen Concept": the act of using a concept while ignoring, contradicting or denying the validity of the concepts on which it logically and/or genetically depends. The idea of the "Stolen Concept" is generally attributed to be first noted by Ayn Rand and then later supported by followers of Objectivism. Much like Objectivism the idea of the "Stolen Concept" does not have mainstream acceptance in academia. An example of the stolen concept fallacy is anarchist Pierre-Joseph Proudhon's statement, "All property is theft".

While discussing the hierarchical nature of knowledge, Nathaniel Branden states, "Theft" is a concept that logically and genetically depends on the antecedent concept of "rightfully owned property"—and refers to the act of taking that property without the owner's consent. If no property is rightfully owned, that is, if nothing is property, there can be no such concept as "theft." Thus, the statement "All property is theft" has an internal contradiction: to use the concept "theft" while denying the validity of the concept of "property," is to use "theft" as a concept to which one has no logical right—that is, as a stolen concept.

Others have said the statement is fallacious only on a superficial reading of Proudhon, devoid of context. Proudhon used the term "property" with reference to claimed ownership in land, factories, etc. He believed such claims were illegitimate, and thus a form of theft from the commons. Proudhon explicitly states that the phrase "property is theft" is analogous to the phrase "slavery is murder". According to Proudhon, the slave, though biologically alive, is clearly in a sense "murdered". The "theft" in his terminology does not refer to ownership any more than the "murder" refers directly to physiological death, but rather both are meant as terms to represent a denial of specific rights.

=== In logic ===
Self-refutation plays an important role in some inconsistency tolerant logics (e.g. paraconsistent logics and direct logic) that lack proof by contradiction. For example, the negation of a proposition can be proved by showing that the proposition implies its own negation. Likewise, it can be inferred that a proposition cannot be proved by (1) showing that a proof would imply the negation of the proposition or by (2) showing a proof would imply that the negation of the proposition can be proved.

== Examples ==
=== Brain in a vat ===
Brain in a vat is a thought experiment in philosophy which is premised upon the skeptical hypothesis that one could actually be a brain in a vat receiving electrical input identical to that which would be coming from the nervous system. Similar premises are found in Descartes's evil demon and dream argument. Philosopher Hilary Putnam argues that some versions of the thought experiment would be inconsistent due to semantic externalism. For a brain in a vat that had only ever experienced the simulated world, the statement "I'm not a brain in a vat" is true. The only possible brains and vats it could be referring to are simulated, and it is true that it is not a simulated brain in a simulated vat. By the same argument, saying "I'm a brain in a vat" would be false.

=== Determinism ===
It has been argued by advocates of libertarian free will that to call determinism a rational statement is doubly self-defeating.

1. To count as rational, a belief must be freely chosen, which according to the determinist is impossible
2. Any kind of debate seems to be posited on the idea that the parties involved are trying to change each other's minds.

=== Ethical egoism ===
It has been argued that extreme ethical egoism is self-defeating. Faced with a situation of limited resources, egoists would consume as much of the resource as they could, making the overall situation worse for everybody. Egoists may respond that if the situation becomes worse for everybody, the egoist will also be negatively placed, such that it is not, in fact, in the egoist's rational self-interest to take things to such extremes. However, the (unregulated) tragedy of the commons and the (one-off) prisoner's dilemma are cases in which, on the one hand, it is rational for an individual to seek to take as much as possible even though to do so makes things worse for everybody,, and on the other hand, the behaviour remains rational even though it is ultimately self-defeating. That is to say, in these cases self-defeating does not imply self-refuting. Egoists might respond that a tragedy of the commons assumes some degree of public land; that is, a commons forbidding homesteading requires regulation. Thus, an argument against the tragedy of the commons, in this belief system, is fundamentally an argument for private property rights and the system that recognizes both property rights and rational self-interest: capitalism.

More generally, egoists might say that an increasing respect for individual rights uniquely allows for increasing wealth creation and increasing usable resources despite a fixed amount of raw materials (e.g., the West pre-1776 versus post-1776, East Germany versus West Germany, Hong Kong versus mainland China, North Korea versus South Korea, etc.).

=== Eliminative materialism ===
The philosopher Mary Midgley states that the idea that nothing exists except matter is also self-refuting because if it were true neither it, nor any other idea, would exist, and similarly that an argument to that effect would be self-refuting because it would deny its own existence. Several other philosophers also argue that eliminative materialism is self-refuting.

However, other forms of materialism may escape this kind of argument because, rather than eliminating the mental, they seek to identify it with, or reduce it to, the material. For instance, identity theorists such as J. J. C. Smart, Ullin Place and E. G. Boring state that ideas exist materially as patterns of neural structure and activity. Christian apologist J.P. Moreland states that such arguments are based on semantics.

=== Evolutionary naturalism ===
Alvin Plantinga argues in his evolutionary argument against naturalism that the combination of naturalism and evolution is "in a certain interesting way self-defeating" because if it were true there would be insufficient grounds to believe that human cognitive faculties are reliable. Consequently, if human cognitive abilities are unreliable, then any human construct, which by implication utilizes cognitive faculties, such as evolutionary theory, would be undermined. In this particular case, it is the confluence of evolutionary theory and naturalism that, according to the argument, undermine the reason for believing themselves to be true. Since Plantinga originally formulated the argument, a few theistic philosophers and Christian apologists have agreed. There has also been a considerable backlash of papers arguing that the argument is flawed in a number of ways, one of the more recent ones published in 2011 by Feng Ye (see also the references in the Evolutionary argument against naturalism article).

=== Foundationalism ===
The philosopher Anthony Kenny argues that the idea, "common to theists like Aquinas and Descartes and to an atheist like Russell" that "Rational belief [is] either self-evident or based directly or indirectly on what is evident" (which he termed "foundationalism" following Plantinga) is self-refuting on the basis that this idea is itself neither self-evident nor based directly or indirectly on what is evident and that the same applies to other formulations of such foundationalism. However, the self-evident impossibility of infinite regress can be offered as a justification for foundationalism. Following the identification of problems with "naive foundationalism", the term is now often used to focus on incorrigible beliefs (modern foundationalism), or basic beliefs (reformed foundationalism).

=== Philosophical skepticism ===
Philosophical skeptics state that "nothing can be known". This has caused some to ask if nothing can be known then can that statement itself be known, or is it self-refuting. One very old response to this problem is academic skepticism: an exception is made for the skeptic's own statement. This leads to further debate about consistency and special pleading. Alternatively, philosophical skepticism can be framed without asserting knowledge, "I don't believe in anything"; when asked "Do you believe that?", which implies to the questioner a logical contradiction, the skeptic can point out that she does not believe in anything, not even the (widely assumed) axioms or inference rules of logic, so there is an absence of logical machinery within her empty belief system with which it can be self-refuted.

=== Relativism ===
It is often stated that relativism about truth must be applied to itself. The cruder form of the argument concludes that since the relativist is calling relativism an absolute truth, it leads to a contradiction. Relativists often rejoin that in fact relativism is only relatively true, leading to a subtler problem: the absolutist, the relativist's opponent, is perfectly entitled, by the relativist's own standards, to reject relativism. That is, the relativist's arguments can have no normative force over someone who has different basic beliefs.

=== Verification and falsification principles ===
The statements "statements are meaningless unless they can be empirically verified" and "statements are meaningless unless they can be empirically falsified" have both been called self-refuting on the basis that they can neither be empirically verified nor falsified. Similar arguments have been made for statements such as "no statements are true unless they can be shown empirically to be true", which was a problem for logical positivism.

=== Moderation In All Things ===
The perhaps ancient, proverbial saying "all things in moderation" is itself a call to excess in that it commands moderation in every single possible thing. An actually moderate assertion would be something like "most things in moderation" or more precisely, "a moderate number of things in moderation." However, many philosophers use the saying in the context of ethics.

== See also ==
- Antinomy
- Peritrope
- Paradox
- Performative contradiction
- Self-defeating prophecy
