= Bi-scalar tensor vector gravity =

Bi-scalar tensor vector gravity theory (BSTV) is an extension of the tensor–vector–scalar gravity theory (TeVeS). TeVeS is a relativistic generalization of Mordehai Milgrom's Modified Newtonian Dynamics MOND paradigm proposed by Jacob Bekenstein. BSTV was proposed by R.H.Sanders. BSTV makes TeVeS more flexible by making a non-dynamical scalar field in TeVeS into a dynamical one.
