= Gauge vector–tensor gravity =

Gauge vector–tensor gravity (GVT) is a relativistic generalization of Mordehai Milgrom's modified Newtonian dynamics (MOND) paradigm where gauge fields cause the MOND behavior. The former covariant realizations of MOND such as the Bekenstein's tensor–vector–scalar gravity and the Moffat's scalar–tensor–vector gravity attribute MONDian behavior to some scalar fields. GVT is the first example wherein the MONDian behavior is mapped to the gauge vector fields. The main features of GVT can be summarized as follows:

- As it is derived from the action principle, GVT respects conservation laws;
- In the weak-field approximation of the spherically symmetric, static solution, GVT reproduces the MOND acceleration formula;
- It can accommodate gravitational lensing.
- It is in total agreement with the Einstein–Hilbert action in the strong and Newtonian gravities.

Its dynamical degrees of freedom are:

- Two gauge fields: $B_{\mu}, \widetilde{B}_{\mu}$;
- A metric, $g_{\mu\nu}$.

== Details ==
The physical geometry, as seen by particles, represents the Finsler geometry–Randers type:

$$ds = \sqrt{-g_{\mu\nu} dx^\mu dx^\nu} + \left (B_\mu + \widetilde{B}_\mu \right ) dx^\mu$$

This implies that the orbit of a particle with mass $m$ can be derived from the following effective action:

$$S= m \int d\tau \left (\frac{1}{2}  \dot{x}^\mu \dot{x}^\nu  g_{\mu\nu}+ \left (B_\mu+\widetilde{B}_\mu \right ) \dot{x}^\mu  \right ).$$

The geometrical quantities are Riemannian. GVT, thus, is a bi-geometric gravity.

=== Action ===
The metric's action coincides to that of the Einstein–Hilbert gravity:

$$S_{\text{Grav}} = \frac{1}{16 \pi G} \int d^4 x  \, \sqrt{-g} R$$

where $R$ is the Ricci scalar constructed out from the metric. The action of the gauge fields follow:

$$\begin{align}
S_{B}  &= -\frac{1}{16 \pi G\kappa \ell^2} \int d^4x \sqrt{- g}\, L \left (\frac{\ell^2}{4} B_{\mu\nu} B^{\mu\nu} \right ) \\
S_{\widetilde{B}}  &= -\frac{1}{16 \pi G\widetilde{\kappa} \widetilde{\ell}^2} \int d^4x \sqrt{- g}\, L \left (\frac{\widetilde{\ell}^2}{4} \widetilde{B}_{\mu\nu} \widetilde{B}^{\mu\nu} \right )
\end{align}$$

where L has the following MOND asymptotic behaviors

$$L(x) =  \begin{cases} x &  x \gg 1 \\ \frac{2}{3}|x|^{\frac{3}{2}} & x \leqslant 1\end{cases}$$

and $\kappa, \widetilde{\kappa}$ represent the coupling constants of the theory while $\ell, \widetilde{\ell}$ are the parameters of the theory and $\ell < \widetilde{\ell}.$

=== Coupling to the matter ===
Metric couples to the energy-momentum tensor. The matter current is the source field of both gauge fields. The matter current is

$$J^\mu = \rho u^\mu$$

where $\rho$ is the density and $u^\mu$ represents the four velocity.

== Regimes of the GVT theory ==
GVT accommodates the Newtonian and MOND regime of gravity; but it admits the post-MONDian regime.

=== Strong and Newtonian regimes ===
The strong and Newtonian regime of the theory is defined to be where holds:

$$\begin{align}
L \left (\frac{\ell^2}{4} B_{\mu\nu} B^{\mu\nu} \right ) &= \frac{\ell^2}{4} B_{\mu\nu} B^{\mu\nu}\\
L \left (\frac{\widetilde{\ell}^2}{4} \widetilde{B}_{\mu\nu} \widetilde{B}^{\mu\nu} \right ) &= \frac{\widetilde{\ell}^2}{4} \widetilde{B}_{\mu\nu} \widetilde{B}^{\mu\nu}
\end{align}$$

The consistency between the gravitoelectromagnetism approximation to the GVT theory and that predicted and measured by the Einstein–Hilbert gravity demands that

$$\kappa + \widetilde{\kappa} =0$$

which results in

$$B_\mu+\widetilde{B}_\mu = 0.$$

So the theory coincides to the Einstein–Hilbert gravity in its Newtonian and strong regimes.

=== MOND regime ===
The MOND regime of the theory is defined to be

$$\begin{align}
L \left (\frac{\ell^2}{4} B_{\mu\nu} B^{\mu\nu} \right ) &= \left|\frac{\ell^2}{4} B_{\mu\nu} B^{\mu\nu}\right|^\frac{3}{2}\\
L \left (\frac{\widetilde{\ell}^2}{4} \widetilde{B}_{\mu\nu} \widetilde{B}^{\mu\nu} \right ) &= \frac{\widetilde{\ell}^2}{4} \widetilde{B}_{\mu\nu} \widetilde{B}^{\mu\nu}
\end{align}$$

So the action for the $B_{\mu}$ field becomes aquadratic. For the static mass distribution, the theory then converts to the AQUAL model of gravity with the critical acceleration of

$$a_0 = \frac{4\sqrt{2}\kappa c^2}{\ell}$$

So the GVT theory is capable of reproducing the flat rotational velocity curves of galaxies. The current observations do not fix $\kappa$ which is supposedly of order one.

=== Post-MONDian regime ===
The post-MONDian regime of the theory is defined where both of the actions of the $B_{\mu}, \widetilde{B}_\mu$ are aquadratic. The MOND type behavior is suppressed in this regime due to the contribution of the second gauge field.

== See also ==
- Dark energy
- Dark fluid
- Dark matter
- General theory of relativity
- Law of universal gravitation
- Modified Newtonian dynamics
- Nonsymmetric gravitational theory
- Pioneer anomaly
- Scalar – scalar field
- Scalar–tensor–vector gravity
- Tensor
- Vector
