= Tensor–vector–scalar gravity =

Relativistic generalization of Mordehai Milgrom's MOND paradigm

Tensor–vector–scalar gravity (TeVeS), developed by Jacob Bekenstein in 2004, is a relativistic generalization of Mordehai Milgrom's Modified Newtonian dynamics (MOND) paradigm.

The main features of TeVeS can be summarized as follows:

- As it is derived from the action principle, TeVeS respects conservation laws;
- In the weak-field approximation of the spherically symmetric, static solution, TeVeS reproduces the MOND acceleration formula;
- TeVeS avoids the problems of earlier attempts to generalize MOND, such as superluminal propagation;
- As it is a relativistic theory it can accommodate gravitational lensing.

The theory is based on the following ingredients:

- A unit vector field;
- A dynamical scalar field;
- A nondynamical scalar field;
- A matter Lagrangian constructed using an alternate metric;
- An arbitrary dimensionless function.

These components are combined into a relativistic Lagrangian density, which forms the basis of TeVeS theory.

== Details ==
MOND is a phenomenological modification of the Newtonian acceleration law. In Newtonian gravity theory, the gravitational acceleration in the spherically symmetric, static field of a point mass $M$ at distance $r$ from the source can be written as

$$a = -\frac{GM}{r^2},$$

where $G$ is Newton's constant of gravitation. The corresponding force acting on a test mass $m$ is

$$F=ma.$$

To account for the anomalous rotation curves of spiral galaxies, Milgrom proposed a modification of this force law in the form

$$F=\mu \left (\frac{a}{a_0} \right )ma,$$

where $\mu(x)$ is an arbitrary function subject to the following conditions:

$$\mu(x)= \begin{cases} 1 & |x|\gg 1 \\ x & |x|\ll 1 \end{cases}$$

In this form, MOND is not a complete theory: for instance, it violates the law of momentum conservation.

However, such conservation laws are automatically satisfied for physical theories that are derived using an action principle. This led Bekenstein to a first, nonrelativistic generalization of MOND. This theory, called AQUAL (for A QUAdratic Lagrangian) is based on the Lagrangian

$${\mathcal L}=-\frac{a_0^2}{8\pi G}f\left(\frac{|\nabla\Phi|^2}{a_0^2}\right)-\rho\Phi,$$

where $\Phi$ is the Newtonian gravitational potential, $\rho$ is the mass density, and $f(y)$ is a dimensionless function.

In the case of a spherically symmetric, static gravitational field, this Lagrangian reproduces the MOND acceleration law after the substitutions $a=-\nabla\Phi$ and $\mu(\sqrt{y})=df(y)/dy$ are made.

Bekenstein further found that AQUAL can be obtained as the nonrelativistic limit of a relativistic field theory. This theory is written in terms of a Lagrangian that contains, in addition to the Einstein–Hilbert action for the metric field $g_{\mu\nu}$, terms pertaining to a unit vector field $u^\alpha$ and two scalar fields $\sigma$ and $\phi$, of which only $\phi$ is dynamical. The TeVeS action, therefore, can be written as

$$S_\mathrm{TeVeS}=\int\left({\mathcal L}_g+{\mathcal L}_s+{\mathcal L}_v\right)d^4x.$$

The terms in this action include the Einstein–Hilbert Lagrangian (using a metric signature $[+,-,-,-]$ and setting the speed of light, $c=1$):

$${\mathcal L}_g=-\frac{1}{16\pi G}R\sqrt{-g},$$

where $R$ is the Ricci scalar and $g$ is the determinant of the metric tensor.

The scalar field Lagrangian is

$${\mathcal L}_s=-\frac{1}{2}\left[\sigma^2h^{\alpha\beta}\partial_\alpha\phi\partial_\beta\phi+\frac{1}{2}\frac{G}{l^2}\sigma^4F \left (kG\sigma^2 \right)\right]\sqrt{-g},$$

where $h^{\alpha\beta}=g^{\alpha\beta}-u^\alpha u^\beta, l$ is a constant length, $k$ is the dimensionless parameter and $F$ an unspecified dimensionless function; while the vector field Lagrangian is

$${\mathcal L}_v=-\frac{K}{32\pi G}\left[g^{\alpha\beta}g^{\mu\nu} \left (B_{\alpha\mu}B_{\beta\nu} \right )+2\frac{\lambda}{K} \left (g^{\mu\nu}u_\mu u_\nu-1 \right )\right]\sqrt{-g}$$

where $B_{\alpha\beta}=\partial_\alpha u_\beta-\partial_\beta u_\alpha,$ while $K$ is a dimensionless parameter. $k$ and $K$ are respectively called the scalar and vector coupling constants of the theory. The consistency between the Gravitoelectromagnetism of the TeVeS theory and that predicted and measured by the Gravity Probe B leads to $K=\frac{k}{2\pi}$, and requiring consistency between the near horizon geometry of a black hole in TeVeS and that of the Einstein theory, as observed by the Event Horizon Telescope leads to $K=-30 + \frac{72 \pi}{k}.$ So the coupling constants read:

$$K= 3(\pm\sqrt{29}-5), \qquad k = 6\pi (\pm \sqrt{29}-5)$$

The function $F$ in TeVeS is unspecified.

TeVeS also introduces a "physical metric" in the form

$${\hat g}^{\mu\nu}=e^{2\phi}g^{\mu\nu}-2u^\alpha u^\beta\sinh(2\phi).$$

The action of ordinary matter is defined using the physical metric:

$$S_m=\int{\mathcal L} \left ({\hat g}_{\mu\nu},f^\alpha,f^\alpha_{|\mu},\ldots \right)\sqrt{-{\hat g}}d^4x,$$

where covariant derivatives with respect to ${\hat g}_{\mu\nu}$ are denoted by $|.$

TeVeS solves problems associated with earlier attempts to generalize MOND, such as superluminal propagation. In his paper, Bekenstein also investigated the consequences of TeVeS in relation to gravitational lensing and cosmology.

== Problems and criticisms ==
In addition to its ability to account for the flat rotation curves of galaxies (which is what MOND was originally designed to address), TeVeS is claimed to be consistent with a range of other phenomena, such as gravitational lensing and cosmological observations. However, Seifert shows that with Bekenstein's proposed parameters, a TeVeS star is highly unstable, on the scale of approximately 10^{6} seconds (two weeks). The ability of the theory to simultaneously account for galactic dynamics and lensing is also challenged. A possible resolution may be in the form of massive (around 2 eV) neutrinos.

A study in August 2006 reported an observation of a pair of colliding galaxy clusters, the Bullet Cluster, whose behavior, it was reported, was not compatible with any current modified gravity theory.

A quantity $E_G$ probing general relativity (GR) on large scales (a hundred billion times the size of the Solar System) for the first time has been measured with data from the Sloan Digital Sky Survey to be $E_G=0.392\pm{0.065}$ (~16%) consistent with GR, GR plus Lambda CDM and the extended form of GR known as $f(R)$ theory, but ruling out a particular TeVeS model predicting $E_G=0.22$. This estimate should improve to ~1% with the next generation of sky surveys and may put tighter constraints on the parameter space of all modified gravity theories.

TeVeS appears inconsistent with recent measurements made by LIGO of gravitational waves.

== See also ==
- Gauge vector–tensor gravity
- Modified Newtonian dynamics
- Nonsymmetric gravitational theory
- Scalar–tensor–vector gravity
