= 3C 438 =

Galaxy in the constellation Cygnus

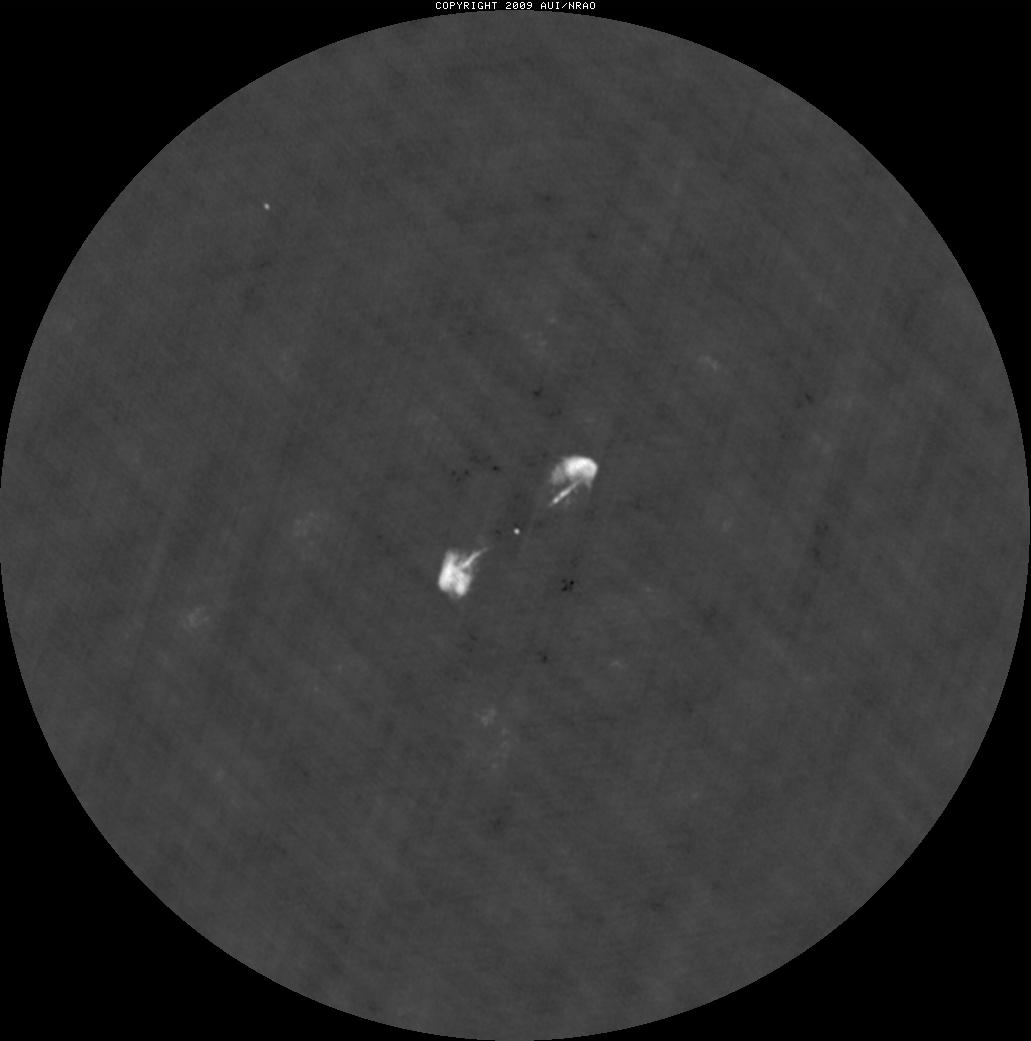
- 3C 438 in radiowaves by the Very Large Array

Observation data (J2000 epoch)
- Constellation: Cygnus
- Right ascension: 21^{h} 55^{m} 52.324^{s}
- Declination: +38° 00′ 28.51″
- Redshift: 0.290
- Distance: 1,113 megaparsecs (3,630 Mly) h^{−1}_{0.73}
- Apparent magnitude (V): 19.20

Characteristics
- Type: SyG, AGN, X, G, QSO; G, FR II, Sy

Other designations
- LEDA 2817736, 3C 438, 4C 37.63

3C 438 is a Seyfert galaxy and Fanaroff and Riley class II radio galaxy located in the constellation Cygnus. The radio galaxy has two lobes and there is a radio jet leading to the south lobe, which also has a prominent double hot spot. There is age variation across the lobes.

3C 438 is a member of a galaxy cluster and three galaxies are located close to it, the closest one being 4 arcseconds to the northeast. The galaxy cluster has been found when observed by the Chandra X-ray Observatory to have hot intergalactic gas, with a temperature of about 11 KeV, which when discovered in 2007 was the highest ever found, slightly hotter than the Bullet Cluster. The high temperature is the result of the merger of two galaxy clusters, as the relative movement of one subcluster has created a bow shock in the hot gas.
