= AQUAL =

Theory of gravity

AQUAL is a theory of gravity based on Modified Newtonian Dynamics (MOND), but using a Lagrangian. It was developed by Jacob Bekenstein and Mordehai Milgrom in their 1984 paper, "Does the missing mass problem signal the breakdown of Newtonian gravity?", as well as a 1986 paper by Milgrom. "AQUAL" stands for "AQUAdratic Lagrangian", stemming from the fact that, in contrast to Newtonian gravity, the proposed Lagrangian is non-quadratic in the potential gradient $|\nabla\Phi|$.

The gravitational force law obtained from MOND,

$$m \mu \left (\frac{a}{a_0} \right) a = \frac{GMm}{r^2},$$

has a serious defect: it violates Newton's third law of motion, and therefore fails to conserve momentum and energy. To see this, consider two objects with $m \neq M$; then we have:

$$\mu \left (\frac{a_m}{a_0} \right) m a_m = \frac{GMm}{r^2} = \frac{GMm}{r^2} = \mu \left (\frac{a_M}{a_0} \right) M a_M$$

but the third law gives $m a_m = M a_M,$ so we would get

$$\mu \left (\frac{a_m}{a_0} \right)=\mu \left (\frac{a_M}{a_0} \right)$$

even though $a_m \neq a_M,$ and $\mu$ would therefore be constant, contrary to the MOND assumption that it is non-linear for small arguments.

This problem can be rectified by deriving the force law from a Lagrangian, at the cost of possibly modifying the general form of the force law. Then conservation laws could then be derived from the Lagrangian by the usual means.

The AQUAL Lagrangian is:

$$\rho \Phi + \frac{1}{8 \pi G} a_0^2 F \left (\frac{|\nabla\Phi|^2}{a_0^2} \right);$$

this leads to a modified Poisson equation:

$$\nabla \cdot \left  (\mu \left (\frac{|\nabla\Phi|}{a_0} \right ) \nabla\Phi \right ) = 4 \pi G \rho, \qquad \text{with } \quad \mu(x) = \frac{dF(x^2)}{dx}.$$

where the predicted acceleration is $-\nabla\Phi = a.$ These equations reduce to the MOND equations in the spherically symmetric case, although they differ somewhat in the disc case needed for modelling spiral or lenticular galaxies. However, the difference is only 10–15%, so does not seriously impact the results.

According to Sanders and McGaugh, one problem with AQUAL (or any scalar–tensor theory in which the scalar field enters as a conformal factor multiplying Einstein's metric) is AQUAL's failure to predict the amount of gravitational lensing actually observed in rich clusters of galaxies. AQUAL has been claimed to match observations of wide binary star orbits.
