= Bullet Cluster =

Two colliding clusters of galaxies in constellation Carina

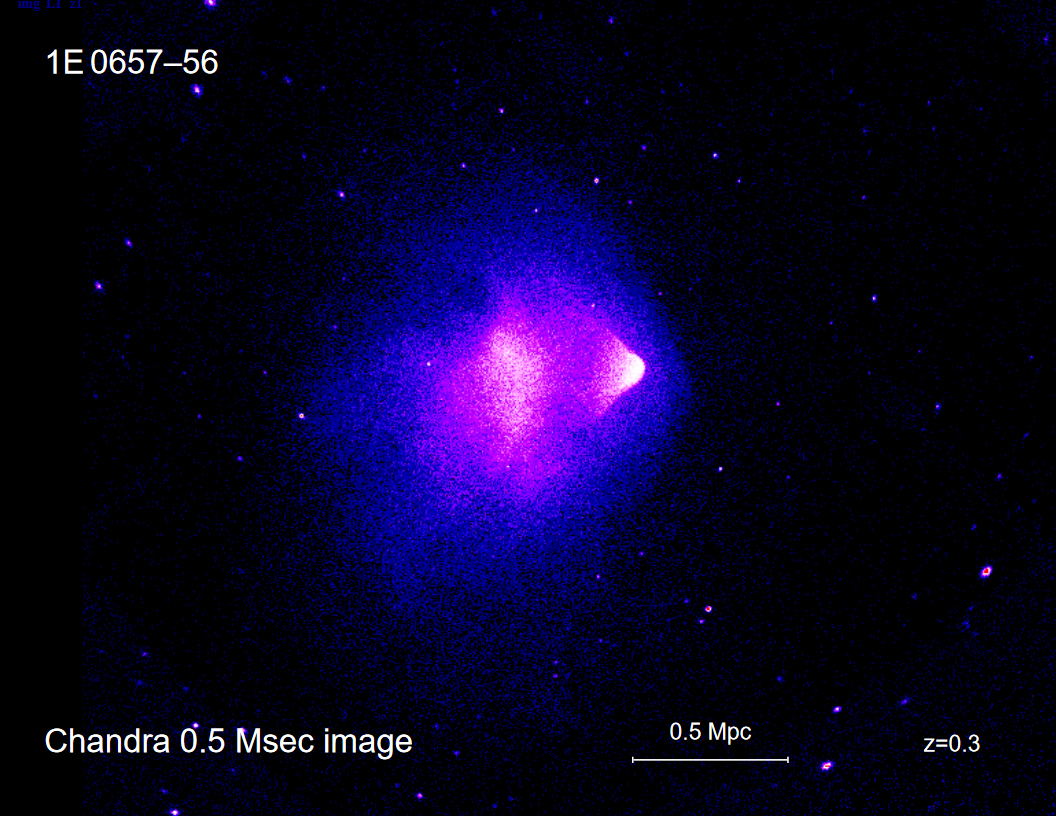
- X-ray photo by Chandra X-ray Observatory. Exposure time was 140 hours. The scale is shown in megaparsecs. Redshift (z) = 0.3, meaning its light has wavelengths stretched by a factor of 1.3.

Observation data (Epoch J2000)
- Constellation: Carina
- Right ascension: 06^{h} 58^{m} 37.9^{s}
- Declination: −55° 57′ 0″
- Number of galaxies: ~40
- Redshift: 0.296
- Distance: 1.141 Gpc (3.7 billion light-years).
- ICM temperature: 17.4 ± 2.5 keV
- X-ray luminosity: 1.4 ± 0.3 × 10^{39} h_{50}^{−2} joule/s (bolometric)
- X-ray flux: 5.6 ± 0.6 × 10^{−19} watt/cm^{2} (0.1–2.4 keV)

Other designations
- 1E 0657-56, 1E 0657-558

The Bullet Cluster (1E 0657-56) consists of two colliding clusters of galaxies. Strictly speaking, the name Bullet Cluster refers to the smaller subcluster, moving away from the larger one. It is at a comoving radial distance of 1.141 Gpc (3.72 billion light-years). The first known reference to this cluster comes from a 1992 paper titled, "The Einstein Slew Survey".

The object is of a particular note for astrophysicists, because gravitational lensing studies of the Bullet Cluster are claimed to provide strong evidence for the existence of dark matter. Observations of other galaxy cluster collisions, such as MACS J0025.4-1222, similarly support the existence of dark matter.

== Overview ==
Bullet Cluster imaged by the DECam. It is made up of two galaxy clusters that are colliding, one moving through the other, about 3.7 billion light-years away in the constellation Carina.

The major components of the cluster pair—stars, gas and the putative dark matter—behave differently during collision, allowing them to be studied separately. The stars of the galaxies, observable in visible light, were not greatly affected by the collision, and most passed right through, gravitationally slowed but not otherwise altered. The hot gas of the two colliding components, seen in X-rays, represents most of the baryonic, or "ordinary", matter in the cluster pair. The gases of the intracluster medium interact electromagnetically, causing the gases of both clusters to slow much more than the stars. The third component, the dark matter, was detected indirectly by the gravitational lensing of background objects, as calculated using the best available theory of gravity in general relativity. This provides support for the idea that most of the gravitation in the cluster pair is in the form of two regions of collisionless dark matter, which bypassed the gas regions during the collision.

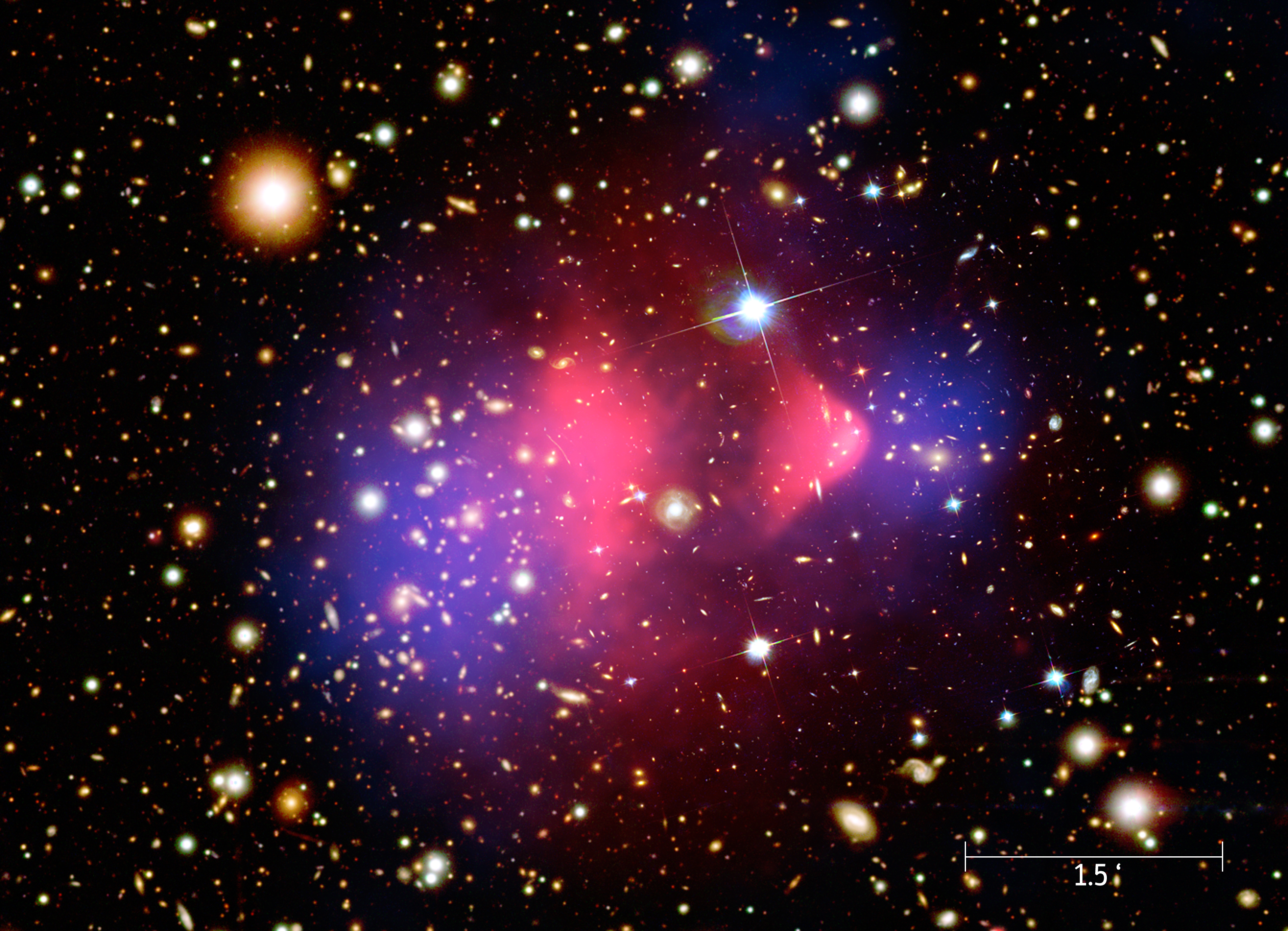
X-ray image (pink) superimposed over a visible light image (galaxies), with matter distribution calculated from gravitational lensing (blue)

The Bullet Cluster is one of the hottest-known clusters of galaxies. It provides an observable constraint for cosmological models, which may diverge at temperatures beyond their predicted critical cluster temperature. Observed from Earth, the subcluster passed through the cluster center 150 million years ago, creating a "bow-shaped shock wave located near the right side of the cluster" formed as "70 million kelvin gas in the sub-cluster plowed through 100 million kelvin gas in the main cluster at a speed of about nearly 10 million km/h (6 million miles per hour)". The bow shock radiation output is equivalent to the energy of 10 typical quasars.

According to Greg Madejski:

Particularly compelling results were inferred from the Chandra observations of the 'bullet cluster' (1E0657-56; Fig. 2) by Markevitch et al. (2004) and Clowe et al. (2004). Those authors report that the cluster is undergoing a high-velocity (around 4,500 km/s) merger, evident from the spatial distribution of the hot, X-ray-emitting gas, but this gas lags behind the subcluster galaxies. Furthermore, the dark matter clump, revealed by the weak lensing map, is coincident with the collisionless galaxies, but lies ahead of the collisional gas. This—and other similar observations—allow good limits on the cross-section of the self-interaction of dark matter.

According to Eric Hayashi:

The velocity of the bullet subcluster is not exceptionally high for a cluster substructure, and can be accommodated within the currently favoured Lambda-CDM model cosmology."

A 2010 study claimed that the velocities of the collision are "incompatible with the prediction of a LCDM model". However, subsequent work has found the collision to be consistent with LCDM simulations, with the previous discrepancy stemming from small simulations and the methodology of identifying pairs. Earlier work claiming the Bullet Cluster was inconsistent with standard cosmology was based on an erroneous estimate of the in-fall velocity based on the speed of the shock in the X-ray-emitting gas. Based on the analysis of the shock driven by the merger, it was recently argued that a lower merger velocity ~3,950 km/s is consistent with the Sunyaev–Zeldovich effect and X-ray data, provided that the equilibration of the electron and ion downstream temperatures is not instantaneous.

== As evidence against modified gravity ==
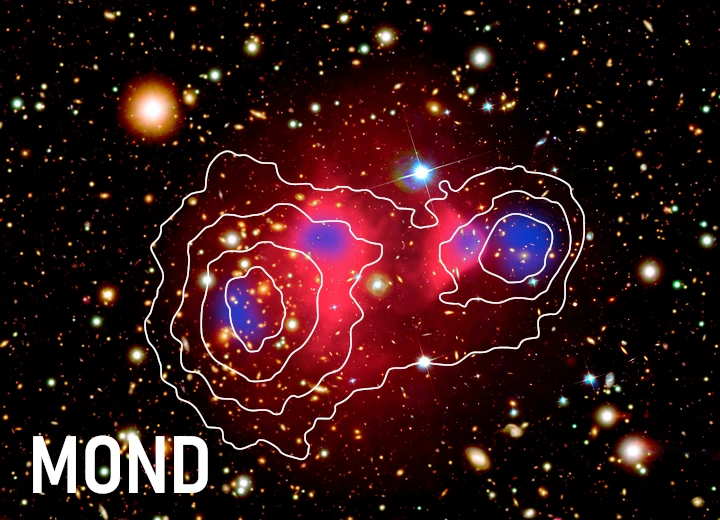
Despite modifying gravity MOND still requires dark matter to fit the observations. The white lines trace the gravitational potential measured by lensing, the pink clouds show hot X-ray emitting gas, the full color dots are galaxies and some foreground stars, the blue is the inferred dark matter distribution. Image based on data from Angus et al. 2006.

The Bullet Cluster has been claimed as a significant challenge for all theories proposing a modified gravity solution to the missing mass problem, including modified Newtonian dynamics (MOND). Astronomers measured the distribution of stellar and gas mass in the clusters using visible and X-ray light, respectively, and also mapped the gravitational potential using gravitational lensing. As shown in the images on the right, the X-ray gas is in the center, while the galaxies are on the outskirts. During the collision, the X-ray gas interacted and slowed down, remaining in the center, while the galaxies largely passed by one another, as the distances between them were vast. The gravitational potential reveals two large concentrations centered on the galaxies, not on the X-ray gas, where most of the normal matter is located. In ΛCDM one would also expect the clusters to each have a dark matter halo that would pass through each other during the collision (assuming, as is conventional, that dark matter is collisionless). This expectation for the dark matter is a clear explanation for the offset between the peaks of the gravitational potential and the X-ray gas which was detected at a statistical significance of 8σ.

It is this offset between the gravitational potential and normal matter that was claimed by Clowe et al. as "A Direct Empirical Proof of the Existence of Dark Matter" arguing that modified gravity theories fail to account for it. However, this study by Clowe et al. made no attempt to analyze the Bullet Cluster using MOND or any other modified gravity theory. Furthermore, in the same year, Angus et al. demonstrated that MOND does indeed reproduce the offset between the gravitational potential and the X-ray gas in this highly non-spherically-symmetric system. In MOND, one would expect the "missing mass" to be centred on regions which experience accelerations lower than a_{0}, which, in the case of the Bullet Cluster, correspond to the areas containing the galaxies, not the X-ray gas. Nevertheless, MOND still fails to fully explain this cluster, as it does with all other galaxy clusters, due to the remaining mass residuals in several core regions of the Bullet Cluster. Mordehai Milgrom, the original proposer of MOND, has posted an online rebuttal of claims that the Bullet Cluster proves the existence of dark matter. He contends that the observed characteristics of the Bullet Cluster could just as well be caused by undetected standard matter. He has argued that all galaxy clusters could host cold dense hydrogen gas clouds of roughly equal to the mass of the visible baryons which could explain the failures of MOND in galaxy clusters. Such cold dense hydrogen clouds are unlikely to exist however due to feedback from AGNs which prevent hydrogen gas from cooling.

There are other alternate theories of gravity like the MOG and Many-body gravity (MBG), which claim to be able to explain the bullet cluster's weak gravitational lensing.

== See also ==
- Galaxy group
- Galaxy cluster
- Abell 520 – a similar galaxy cluster whose dark and luminous matter may have been separated during a major collision
- NGC 1052-DF2
- List of galaxy groups and clusters
