= Jacob Bekenstein =

Mexican-Israeli physicist (1947–2015)

- יעקב בקנשטיין
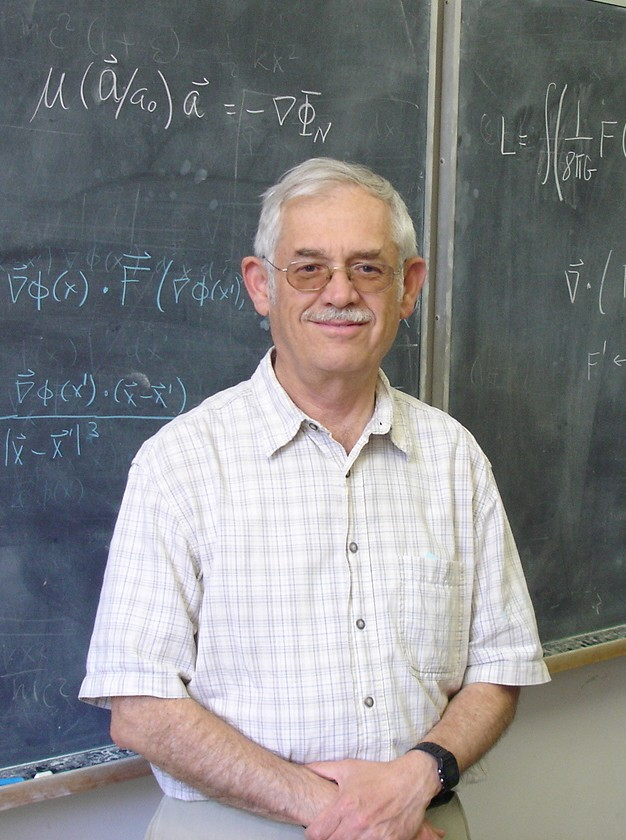
- Bekenstein in 2009
- Born: Jacob David Bekenstein; May 1, 1947; Mexico City, Mexico
- Died: August 16, 2015 (aged 68); Helsinki, Finland
- Education: Polytechnic Institute of Brooklyn; Princeton University
- Known for: Bekenstein bound; Bekenstein–Hawking formula; Black hole thermodynamics; No-hair theorem; AQUAL; Tensor–vector–scalar gravity
- Awards: Rothschild Prize in Physics (1988); Israel Prize (2005); Racah Lecture (2006); Wolf Prize in Physics (2012); Einstein Prize (APS) (2015)
- Scientific career
- Fields: Theoretical physics
- Workplaces: Hebrew University of Jerusalem; Ben-Gurion University of the Negev
- Doctoral advisor: John Wheeler

Jacob David Bekenstein (Hebrew: יעקב דוד בקנשטיין; May 1, 1947 – August 16, 2015) was a Mexican-born American-Israeli theoretical physicist who made fundamental contributions to the foundation of black hole thermodynamics and to other aspects of the connections between information and gravitation.

== Early life and education ==
Jacob Bekenstein was born in Mexico City to Joseph and Esther (née Vladaslavotsky), Polish Jews who immigrated to Mexico. He moved to the United States during his early life, gaining U.S. citizenship in 1968. He was also a citizen of Israel.

Bekenstein attended the Polytechnic Institute of Brooklyn, now known as the New York University Tandon School of Engineering, obtaining both an undergraduate degree and a Master of Science degree in 1969. He went on to receive a Doctor of Philosophy degree from Princeton University, working under the direction of John Archibald Wheeler, in 1972.

Bekenstein had three children with his wife, Bilha. All three children, Yehonadav, (Note: In 2018, Yehonadav joined the Department of Materials Science and Engineering at the Technion as an assistant professor.) Uriya and Rivka Bekenstein, became scientists. Bekenstein was known as a religious man and a believer, being quoted as saying: "I look at the world as a product of God, He set very specific laws and we delight in discovering them through scientific work."

== Scientific career ==
By 1972, Bekenstein had published three influential papers about the black hole stellar phenomenon, postulating the no-hair theorem and presenting a theory on black hole thermodynamics. In the years to come, Bekenstein continued his exploration of black holes, publishing papers on their entropy and quantum mass.

Bekenstein was a postdoctoral fellow at the University of Texas at Austin from 1972 to 1974. He then immigrated to Israel to lecture and teach at Ben-Gurion University in Beersheba. In 1978, he became a full professor and in 1983, head of the astrophysics department.

In 1990, he became a professor at the Hebrew University of Jerusalem and was appointed head of its theoretical physics department three years later. He was elected to the Israel Academy of Sciences and Humanities in 1997. He was a visiting scholar at the Institute for Advanced Study in 2009 and 2010.

In addition to lectures and residencies around the world, Bekenstein continued to serve as Polak professor of theoretical physics at the Hebrew University until his death at the age of 68, in Helsinki, Finland. He died unexpectedly on August 16, 2015, just months after receiving the American Physical Society's Einstein Prize "for his ground-breaking work on black hole entropy, which launched the field of black hole thermodynamics and transformed the long effort to unify quantum mechanics and gravitation". He died while on a visit to Helsinki.

== Contributions to physics ==
In 1972, Bekenstein was the first to suggest that black holes should have a well-defined entropy. He wrote that a black hole's entropy was proportional to the area of its (the black hole's) event horizon. Bekenstein also formulated the generalized second law of thermodynamics, black hole thermodynamics, for systems including black holes. Both contributions were affirmed when Stephen Hawking (and, independently, Zeldovich and others) proposed the existence of Hawking radiation two years later. Hawking had initially opposed Bekenstein's idea on the grounds that a black hole could not radiate energy and therefore could not have entropy. However, in 1974, Hawking performed a lengthy calculation that convinced him that particles can indeed be emitted from black holes. Today this is known as Hawking radiation. Bekenstein's doctoral adviser, John Archibald Wheeler, also worked with him to develop the no-hair theorem, a reference to Wheeler's saying that "black holes have no hair," in the early 1970s. Bekenstein's suggestion was proven unstable, but it was influential in the development of the field.

Based on his black-hole thermodynamics work, Bekenstein also demonstrated the Bekenstein bound: there is a maximum to the amount of information that can potentially be stored in a given finite region of space which has a finite amount of energy (which is similar to the holographic principle).

In 1982, Bekenstein developed a rigorous framework to generalize the laws of electromagnetism to handle inconstant physical constants. His framework replaces the fine-structure constant by a scalar field. However, this framework for changing constants did not incorporate gravity.

In 2004, Bekenstein boosted Mordehai Milgrom's theory of Modified Newtonian Dynamics (MOND) by developing a relativistic version. It is known as TeVeS for Tensor/Vector/Scalar and it introduces three different fields in spacetime to replace the one gravitational field.

== Awards and recognition ==
- Ernst David Bergmann Prize for Science (Israel) in 1977
- Landau Prize for Research in Physics (Israel) in 1981
- First prize essay for the Gravity Research Foundation (United States) in 1981
- Rothschild Prize in the Physical Sciences in 1988
- Elected to the Israel Academy of Sciences and Humanities in 1997
- Second prize essay for the Gravity Research Foundation in 2001
- Elected to the World Jewish Academy of Sciences in 2003
- Israel Prize in Physics in 2005
- Weizmann Prize in the Exact Sciences (Tel Aviv, Israel) in 2011
- Wolf Prize in Physics in 2012
- Einstein Prize of the American Physical Society in 2015

== Published works ==
- J. D. Bekenstein, Information in the Holographic Universe. Scientific American, Volume 289, Number 2, August 2003, p. 61.
- J. D. Bekenstein and M. Schiffer, Quantum Limitations on the Storage and Transmission of Information, Int. J. of Modern Physics 1:355–422 (1990).
- J. D. Bekenstein, Entropy content and information flow in systems with limited energy, Phys. Rev. D 30:1669–1679 (1984) . [citeseer]
- J. D. Bekenstein, Communication and energy, Phys. Rev A 37(9):3437–3449 (1988) . [citeseer]
- J. D. Bekenstein, Entropy bounds and the second law for black holes, Phys. Rev. D 27(10):2262–2270 (1983). [citeseer]
- J. D. Bekenstein, Specific entropy and the sign of the energy, Phys. Rev. D 26(4):950–953 (1982). [citeseer]
- J. D. Bekenstein, Black holes and everyday physics, General Relativity and Gravitation, 14(4):355–359 (1982). [citeseer]
- J. D. Bekenstein, Universal upper bound to entropy-to-energy ratio for bounded systems, Phys. Rev. D 23:287–298 (1981). [citeseer]
- J. D. Bekenstein, Energy cost of information transfer, Phys. Rev. Lett 46:623–626. (1981). [citeseer]
- J. D. Bekenstein, Black-hole thermodynamics, Physics Today, 24–31 (Jan. 1980).
- J. D. Bekenstein, Statistical black hole thermodynamics, Phys. Rev. D 12:3077–3085 (1975). [citeseer]
- J. D. Bekenstein, Generalized second law of thermodynamics in black hole physics, Phys. Rev. D 9:3292–3300 (1974) . [citeseer]
- J. D. Bekenstein, Black holes and entropy, Phys. Rev. D 7:2333–2346 (1973). [citeseer]
- J. D. Bekenstein, Black holes and the second law, Nuovo Cimento Letters 4:737–740 (1972).
- J. D. Bekenstein, Nonexistence of baryon number of static black holes, Phys. Rev. D 5:2403–2412 (1972). [citeseer]
