= Pavel Kroupa =

Czech-Australian astrophysicist (born 1963)

Pavel Kroupa (born 24 September 1963, Jindřichův Hradec, Czechoslovakia) is a Czech-Australian astrophysicist and professor at the University of Bonn, Germany, where he holds a position at the Helmholtz-Institut für Strahlen- und Kernphysik (HISKP). He also holds an affiliation with the Astronomical Institute of Charles University in Prague, where he was named Professorem Hospitem in 2017.

Kroupa leads the Stellar Populations and Dynamics Research (SPODYR) group. He is internationally recognised for his foundational contributions to the theory of the stellar initial mass function (IMF), the dynamics of binary star systems and star clusters, the Integrated Galactic Initial Mass Function (IGIMF) theory, and for his research critically examining the standard ΛCDM cosmological model and exploring Milgromian dynamics (MOND) as an alternative framework.

He is the author of 389 refereed publications cited more than 32,800 times, with an h-index of 84 as of March 2026. In 2024 he was listed among the top-ranked scholars of all time across all fields by ScholarGPS, as the top scholar at Charles University in Prague and sixth at the University of Bonn.

== Early Life and Background ==
Kroupa was born on 24 September 1963 in Jindřichův Hradec, Czechoslovakia. When the Prague Spring failed in August 1968 and Warsaw Pact forces invaded, his father fled the country with him on the first night of the invasion.

The family subsequently lived in: Kassel, West Germany (1968–1972); Pretoria, South Africa (1972–1977); Göttingen, West Germany (1977–1983); and Perth, Western Australia (1983–1988). He attended the Christian Brothers' Catholic School in Pretoria and the Theodor-Heuss-Gymnasium in Göttingen, the latter until 1983.

Kroupa holds dual Australian and Czech citizenship.

== Education ==
Kroupa commenced physics studies at the University of Western Australia (UWA), Perth, in 1984. In 1986–87 he held a Summer Vacation Scholarship at Mount Stromlo Observatory, Australian National University, Canberra. He graduated in 1988 with a first-class BSc (Honours) in physics from UWA, supervised by Dr. David Blair and Dr. Ron Burman.

In 1988 he was awarded an Isaac Newton Studentship by the University of Cambridge and selected for membership at Trinity College. He commenced his PhD in astrophysics at the Institute of Astronomy, Cambridge, supervised by Dr. Gerard F. Gilmore, with Christopher A. Tout as mentor. In January–March 1991 he was a Visiting Research Fellow at the University of California, Santa Cruz. In October 1991 he was awarded the Senior Rouse Ball Research Studentship by Trinity College.

He successfully defended his PhD thesis, The distribution of low-mass stars in the Galactic disc, at Cambridge in May 1992.

In 2002 he earned his Habilitation at Kiel University with the thesis Binary Systems, Star Clusters and the Galactic-Field Population.

== Academic Career ==
=== Heidelberg (1992–2000) ===
Following his doctorate, Kroupa took up a five-year research appointment at the Astronomisches Rechen-Institut (ARI), Heidelberg, under Prof. Dr. Roland Wielen. In 1997 he moved to the Institut für Theoretische Astrophysik, University of Heidelberg, under Prof. Dr. Werner Tscharnuter, and subsequently spent periods at the Max-Planck-Institut für Astronomie (MPIA). In March–July 1999 he was a Smithsonian Short-Term Visitor at the Harvard–Smithsonian Center for Astrophysics.

=== Kiel University (2000–2004) ===
In November 2000 Kroupa moved to Kiel University. He completed his Habilitation there in 2002 and was awarded a five-year Heisenberg Fellowship by the DFG in November 2002.

=== University of Bonn (2004–present) ===
In April 2004 Kroupa was appointed professor of astronomy at the Sternwarte der Universität Bonn (since 2006 part of the Argelander-Institut für Astronomie, AIfA). In October 2013 he transferred to the HISKP at the University of Bonn. In 2012 he was elected Managing Director of the AIfA for one academic year. In 2023 he was appointed Equal Opportunities Officer (Gleichstellungsbeauftragter) at the University of Bonn.

=== Charles University in Prague (2016–present) ===
From 1 August 2016, Kroupa took up an affiliation with the Astronomical Institute of Charles University in Prague. On 3 May 2017 he was named Professorem Hospitem by the Rector of Charles University.

=== Visiting Positions ===
- ESO Senior Visitor, Santiago, Chile (February–March 2006)
- Swinburne Visiting Professor, Melbourne (March 2007)
- Leverhulme Trust Visiting Professor, University of Sheffield (July–September 2007 and 2008)
- Guest Professor, University of Vienna (March–April 2014)
- Visiting Professor, Charles University in Prague (November–December 2015)
- ESO Visiting Scientist, Garching (2010)
- ESO Visiting Scientist, Garching (September–October 2017)
- ESO Visiting Scientist, Santiago (November 2018)
- ESO Visiting Scientist, Garching (June–August 2019)

== Research ==
=== Initial Mass Function ===
Kroupa's most widely cited work concerns the stellar initial mass function (IMF). Working in Cambridge (1990–1992) with Christopher A. Tout and Gerard F. Gilmore, he analysed star count and binary star data, incorporating advanced physics of the stellar mass-luminosity relation and corrections for unresolved binary systems and a Galactic field model. This work yielded what became known as the canonical IMF — a two-part power-law form.

The papers Kroupa, Tout & Gilmore (1993) and Kroupa (2001) have together received more than 7,843 citations. The 2002 Science paper "The Initial Mass Function of Stars: Evidence for Uniformity in Variable Systems" was published as an invited review.

=== IGIMF Theory ===
In 2003 Kroupa and later PhD student Carsten Weidner introduced the Integrated Galactic Initial Mass Function (IGIMF) Theory, a framework for calculating the galaxy-wide stellar IMF from its constituent embedded star clusters.

The theory predicts that the galaxy-wide IMF differs systematically from the IMF of individual clusters, with proposed consequences including:

- Star-forming dwarf galaxies being Hα-dim relative to their UV luminosity
- Disk galaxies displaying radial Hα cutoffs
- The mass-metallicity relation of galaxies
- The chemical enrichment histories of elliptical galaxies

In 2013 Kroupa and collaborators proposed that the stellar IMF represents an optimally sampled distribution function rather than a probability density distribution.

=== Binary Stars and Star Cluster Dynamics ===
Kroupa pioneered the treatment of an initial 100% binary fraction in stellar populations, working in part through interactions with N-body simulation developer Sverre Aarseth. His 1995 papers demonstrated that the lower binary fraction in the Galactic field (~50%) compared to young star-forming regions (~100%) results from dynamical disruption as clusters disperse. He also derived birth distribution functions of binary star periods, mass ratios, and eccentricities now used as standard inputs for population synthesis.

Extensions of this work produced predictions for stellar ejections from young clusters, new assessments of Cepheid populations, and quantification of stellar merger frequencies.

Research on tidal tails of open star clusters found an asymmetry in leading and trailing tails, which Kroupa and collaborators argue provides evidence for Milgromian dynamics on open cluster scales.

=== Brown Dwarfs and Planetary Systems ===
Kroupa's research demonstrated a statistical discontinuity between brown dwarfs and stars in the IMF. Together with Ingo Thies and Christian Theis, he proposed in 2003–2004 that brown dwarfs and extrasolar planetary systems may form in circumstellar disks disrupted by passing stars in dense embedded clusters. Subsequent work proposed that such stellar encounters can also produce misaligned orbits and short-period eccentric exoplanets.

=== Satellite Galaxies and the Plane of Satellites Problem ===
In 1997 Kroupa presented stellar-dynamical models suggesting that the dwarf satellite galaxies of the Milky Way could be explained without invoking exotic dark matter. He subsequently identified what is now known as the satellite galaxy plane problem: the eleven classical satellite galaxies of the Milky Way appear to lie in a thin disk — the Vast Polar Structure (VPOS) — which Kroupa and collaborators argue is statistically incompatible with the isotropic sub-halo distribution predicted by the ΛCDM model.

This analysis was extended to show that satellite planes around both the Milky Way and Andromeda form a symmetrical structure.

A proposed explanation is that these satellites formed as tidal dwarf galaxies during a close encounter between the Milky Way and another galaxy approximately 10–11 Gyr ago, consistent with Milgromian dynamics.

=== Cosmological Tests and MOND ===
Since approximately 2010, Kroupa's group has applied multiple independent observational tests to the ΛCDM cosmological model. These include:

- The El Gordo galaxy cluster test: the observed mass and collision velocity of the El Gordo cluster are argued to be incompatible with ΛCDM predictions.
- The KBC void test: the local underdensity of matter and associated galaxy bulk flows are argued to challenge ΛCDM, with Milgromian cosmological models proposed as an alternative and solving the Hubble tension self-consistently.
- The Fornax cluster dwarf galaxy test: the morphologies and distribution of Fornax cluster dwarfs are argued to be inconsistent with ΛCDM predictions for dark matter halos.
- The Chandrasekhar dynamical friction test: Kroupa introduced this test and applied it to the Magellanic Clouds' motion about each other and past the Milky Way, arguing the result indicates the absence of a dark matter halo.
- The galaxy-bar test: independently conducted work with Roshan et al. (2021) argued that observed galaxy bar rotation rates are inconsistent with dark matter halos.

Kroupa led the development of the Phantom of Ramses (PoR) code for Milgromian galaxy simulations.

His group has proposed the Bohemian Model of Cosmology as a possible framework addressing the Hubble tension, galaxy bulk flows, and the KBC void.

Within the IGIMF theory framework, work by Eda Gjergo and Kroupa proposed that massive elliptical galaxies were far brighter when forming, around redshift 17, than today, with their formation contributing as a previously overlooked, non-negligible foreground component of the cosmic microwave background (CMB) — accounting for at least 1.4% and potentially up to the full present-day CMB energy density in some estimates. A 2020 paper proposed a mechanism for the rapid early formation of super-massive black holes consistent with early quasar observations.

=== Magellanic Clouds Proper Motions ===
In 1994 and 1997, Kroupa and Ulrich Bastian published the first precise proper motion measurements of the Magellanic Clouds using Hipparcos data.

=== Star Formation and Galactic Structure ===
Kroupa proposed modelling galaxies as systems where stars form in embedded star cluster populations rather than continuously from a smooth interstellar medium. This explained the age-related thickening of the Milky Way disk as a consequence of gas expulsion from embedded clusters, and predicted the Milky Way would have resembled a chain galaxy approximately 10 Gyr ago.

== Prizes and Awards ==
- 1986–87: Summer Vacation Scholarship, Mount Stromlo Observatory, ANU
- 1988–1991: Isaac Newton Studentship, University of Cambridge
- 1991–1992: Senior Rouse Ball Research Studentship, Trinity College, Cambridge
- 1999: Smithsonian Short-Term Visiting Fellowship, Harvard-Smithsonian CfA
- 2002–2007: Heisenberg Fellowship, DFG
- 2006: ESO Senior Visitor, Santiago, Chile
- 2007: Swinburne Visiting Professorship, Melbourne
- 2007–2008: Leverhulme Trust Visiting Professorship, University of Sheffield
- 2010: ESO Visiting Scientist, Garching
- 2012: Elected Managing Director, AIfA, University of Bonn
- 2013 (1 August): Silver Commemorative Medal of the Senate of the Czech Republic
- 2014: Guest Professorship, University of Vienna
- 2016: ESO Visiting Scientist, Garching
- 2017: Named Professorem Hospitem, Charles University in Prague
- 2017: INNOLEC Lectureship in Theoretical Physics, Masaryk University, Brno
- 2018: ESO Visiting Scientist, Santiago, Chile
- 2019 (June–August): ESO Visiting Scientist, Garching
- 2019 (25 October): Crystal Rose, Jindřichův Hradec
- 2021 (9 April): Golden Webinar in Astrophysics
- 2024–present: Highly Ranked Scholar (Lifetime / All Fields), ScholarGPS

== Graduate Students and Research Group ==
As of March 2026, Kroupa has successfully supervised 26 completed PhD students, with 9 currently enrolled (1 in Prague, 8 in Bonn). He has mentored one Habilitation. Two of his PhD students subsequently won Hubble Fellowships. The SPODYR group has hosted 10 Alexander von Humboldt Fellows, 1 Alexander von Humboldt Research Awardee, 1 Marie Curie Fellow, and 1 Heisenberg Fellow.

== Research Funding ==
Kroupa has received grants from the DFG, Czech grant agencies, the Alexander von Humboldt Foundation, and other bodies. Total third-party funding amounts to approximately 9 million Euro.

== Selected Publications ==
- Kroupa, P., Burman, R.R., Blair, D.G. (1989). "Photometric observations of flares on Proxima Centauri." PASA, 8, 119. http://adsabs.harvard.edu/abs/1989PASAu...8..119K
- Kroupa, P., Tout, C.A., Gilmore, G. (1993). "The distribution of low-mass stars in the Galactic disc." MNRAS, 262, 545. http://adsabs.harvard.edu/abs/1993MNRAS.262..545K
- Kroupa, P. (1995a). "Inverse dynamical population synthesis and star formation." MNRAS, 277, 1491. http://adsabs.harvard.edu/abs/1995MNRAS.277.1491K
- Kroupa, P. (1995b). "The dynamical properties of stellar systems in the Galactic disc." MNRAS, 277, 1507. http://adsabs.harvard.edu/abs/1995MNRAS.277.1507K
- Kroupa, P., Bastian, U. (1997). "The HIPPARCOS proper motion of the Magellanic Clouds." New Astronomy, 2, 77. http://adsabs.harvard.edu/abs/1997NewA....2...77K
- Kroupa, P. (1997). "Dwarf spheroidal satellite galaxies without dark matter." New Astronomy, 2, 139. http://adsabs.harvard.edu/abs/1997NewA....2..139K
- Kroupa, P. (2002). "The Initial Mass Function of Stars: Evidence for Uniformity in Variable Systems." Science, 295, 82. http://adsabs.harvard.edu/abs/2002Sci...295...82K
- Kroupa, P. (2002). "Thickening of galactic discs through clustered star formation." MNRAS, 330, 707. http://adsabs.harvard.edu/abs/2002MNRAS.330..707K
- Kroupa, P., Weidner, C. (2003). "Galactic-Field Initial Mass Functions and the Random Sampling Hypothesis." ApJ, 598, 1076. https://ui.adsabs.harvard.edu/abs/2003ApJ...598.1076K/abstract
- Weidner, C., Kroupa, P. (2004). "Evidence for a fundamental stellar upper mass limit from clustered star formation." MNRAS, 348, 187. http://adsabs.harvard.edu/abs/2004MNRAS.348..187W
- Thies, I., Kroupa, P., Theis, C. (2005). "Induced planet formation in stellar clusters." MNRAS, 364, 961. http://adsabs.harvard.edu/abs/2005MNRAS.364..961T
- Pflamm-Altenburg, J., Kroupa, P. (2008). "Clustered star formation as a natural explanation for the H-alpha cut-off in disk galaxies." Nature, 455, 641. http://adsabs.harvard.edu/abs/2008Natur.455..641P
- Kroupa, P. et al. (2010). "Local-Group tests of dark-matter concordance cosmology." A&A, 523, 32. http://adsabs.harvard.edu/abs/2010A%26A...523A..32K
- Pawlowski, M., Pflamm-Altenburg, J., Kroupa, P. (2012). "The VPOS: a vast polar structure of satellite galaxies, globular clusters and streams around the Milky Way." MNRAS. http://adsabs.harvard.edu/abs/2012arXiv1204.5176P
- Kroupa, P. (2012). "The Dark Matter Crisis: Falsification of the Current Standard Model of Cosmology." PASA, 29, 395. http://adsabs.harvard.edu/abs/2012PASA...29..395K
- Kroupa, P., Pawlowski, M., Milgrom, M. (2012). "The Failures of the Standard Model of Cosmology Require a New Paradigm." IJMPD, 21, 1230003. http://adsabs.harvard.edu/abs/2012IJMPD..2130003K
- Kroupa, P. (2015). "Galaxies as simple dynamical systems." Canadian Journal of Physics, 93, 169. http://adsabs.harvard.edu/abs/2015CaJPh..93..169K
- Kroupa, P. et al. (2022). "Asymmetrical tidal tails of open star clusters." MNRAS. http://adsabs.harvard.edu/abs/2022arXiv221013472K
- Kroupa, P., Pflamm-Altenburg, J., Mazurenko, S., Wu, W., Thies, I. et al. (2024). "Open Star Clusters and Their Asymmetrical Tidal Tails." ApJ, 970, 94. doi:10.3847/1538-4357/ad4c66
- Zonoozi, A.H., Mahani, H., Kroupa, P. (2019). "Was the Milky Way a chain galaxy?" MNRAS, 483(1), 46–56. doi:10.1093/mnras/sty2812
- Hernandez, X., Kroupa, P. (2025). "Dynamical Friction Constraints on the Dark Matter Hypothesis Across Astronomical Scales." Universe, 11(11), 367. doi:10.3390/universe11110367
- Mazurenko, S., Banik, I., Kroupa, P., Haslbauer, M. (2023). "A simultaneous solution to the Hubble tension and observed bulk flow within 250/h Mpc." MNRAS. https://arxiv.org/abs/2311.17988
- Gjergo, E., Kroupa, P. (2025). "The Impact of Early Massive Galaxy Formation on the Cosmic Microwave Background." Nuclear Physics B. https://ui.adsabs.harvard.edu/abs/2025NuPhB101716931G
- Gjergo, E., Zhang, X., Kroupa, P. (2026). "The Initial Mass Function as the Equilibrium State of a Variational Process." RAA, 26. https://ui.adsabs.harvard.edu/abs/2026RAA....26e5012G
- Zhang, X., Zonoozi, A., Kroupa, P. (2026). "Revisiting the missing mass problem in MOND for nearby galaxy clusters." Physical Review D, 113, 043027. https://ui.adsabs.harvard.edu/abs/2026PhRvD.113d3027Z
- Haas, J., Kroupa, P., Mazurenko, S. (2026). "Intermediate-mass black hole incubators in galactic central molecular zones." A&A, 705, L15. https://ui.adsabs.harvard.edu/abs/2026A%26A...705L..15H
