= Stacy McGaugh =

American astronomer (born 1964)

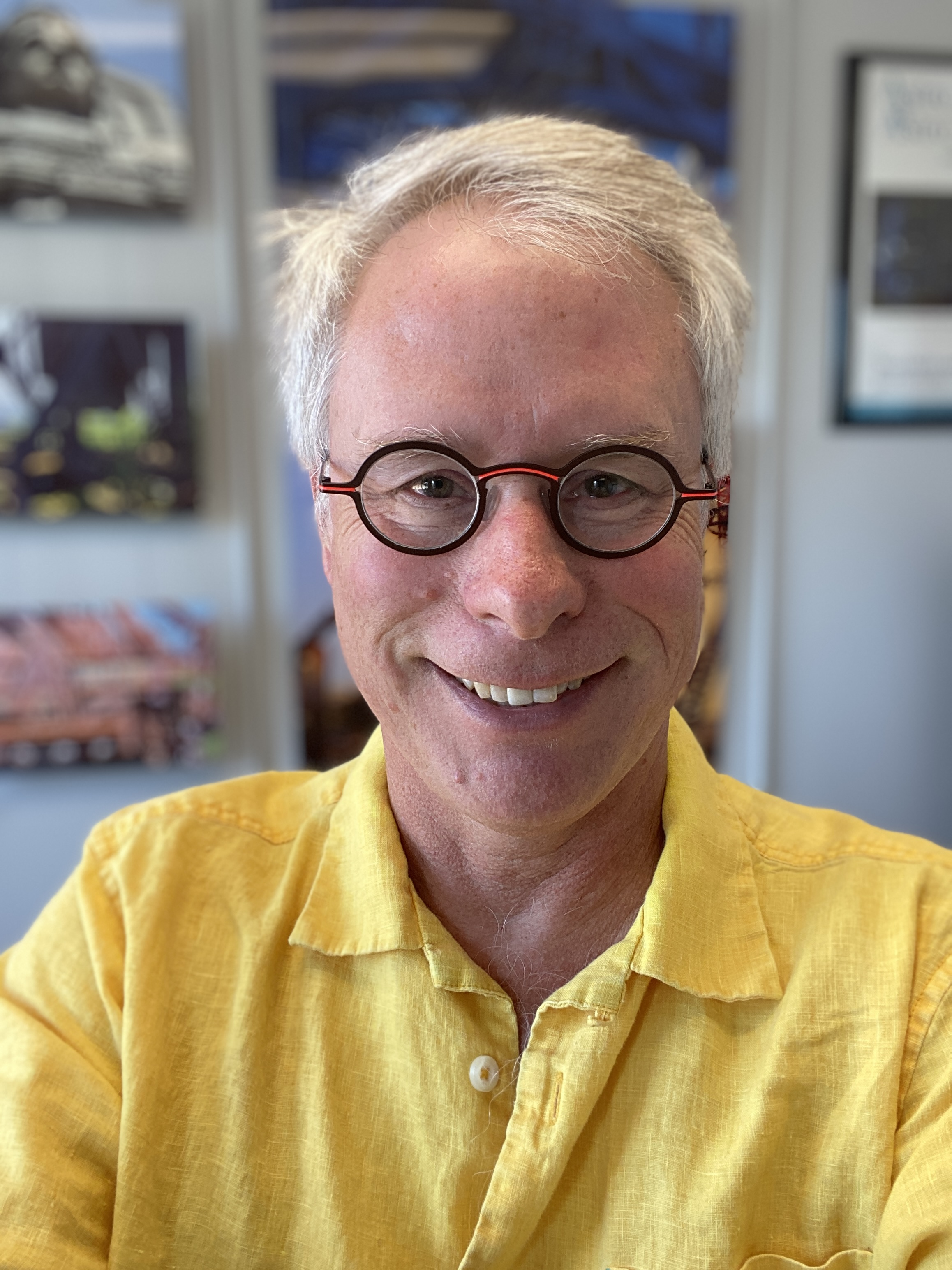
- Stacy McGaugh in 2024
- Born: January 11, 1964 (age 62)
- Education: MIT (S.B. 1985), Princeton and the University of Michigan (Ph.D. 1992)
- Spouse: Anne Kugler
- Children: 2
- Scientific career
- Fields: extragalactic astronomy; MOND; dark matter
- Workplaces: University of Maryland; Case Western Reserve University
- Thesis: The Physical Properties of Low Surface Brightness Galaxies (1992)
- Doctoral advisor: Greg Bothun
- Doctoral students: Jay Franck, Ji Hoon Kim, Rachel Kuzio de Naray, Pengfei Li, Jim Marshall

Stacy McGaugh (born January 11, 1964) is an American astronomer and professor in the Department of Astronomy at Case Western Reserve University in Cleveland, Ohio. His fields of specialty include low surface brightness galaxies, galaxy formation and evolution, tests of dark matter and alternative hypotheses, and measurements of cosmological parameters.

== Education and career ==
McGaugh was an undergraduate student at MIT (S.B. 1985) and a graduate student at Princeton and the University of Michigan (Ph.D. 1992). He held postdoctoral appointments at Cambridge University, the Carnegie Institution of Washington, and Rutgers University before joining the faculty of the University of Maryland in 1998. He moved to Case Western in 2012.

== Research ==
McGaugh has worked on extragalactic astronomy, including on elemental abundances and galactic chemical evolution in H II regions, and on low surface brightness galaxies and kinematics of disk galaxies.

== See also ==
- Low Surface Brightness Galaxies
- Dark matter
- Modified Newtonian dynamics
