= Mordehai Milgrom =

Israeli physicist (born 1946)

- מרדכי מילגרום
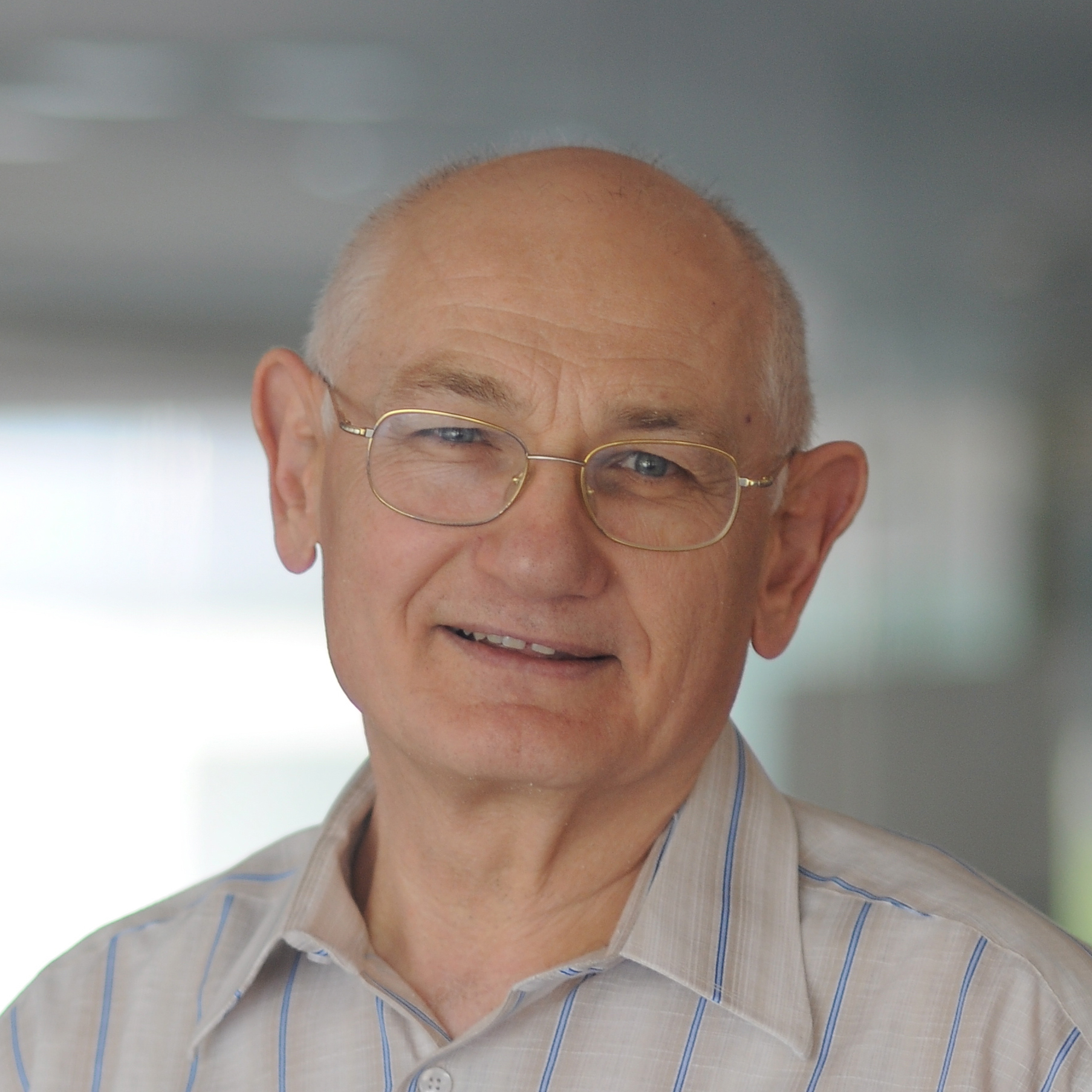
- Born: 1946 (age 79–80); Iași, Romania
- Education: Hebrew University; Weizmann Institute
- Known for: Modified Newtonian dynamics
- Scientific career
- Fields: Astrophysics
- Workplaces: Weizmann Institute

Mordehai "Moti" Milgrom (Hebrew: מרדכי "מוטי" מילגרום) is an Israeli physicist and professor in the department of Particle Physics and Astrophysics at the Weizmann Institute in Rehovot, Israel.

== Education ==
He received his B.Sc. degree from the Hebrew University of Jerusalem in 1966. Later he studied at the Weizmann Institute of Science and completed his doctorate in 1972.

== Career ==
Before 1980 he worked primarily on high-energy astrophysics and became well known for his kinematical model of the star system SS 433. In the academic years 1980–1981 and 1985–1986 he was at the Institute for Advanced Study in Princeton. In 1983, he proposed modified Newtonian dynamics (MOND) as an alternative to the dark matter and galaxy rotation curve problems, although preliminary work and discussions on this subject started as early as 1981.

=== Milgrom and modified Newtonian dynamics ===
Milgrom is a prominent proponent of the hypothesis that Newton's law of universal gravitation should be modified for very small accelerations, typically of the order of 10^{−11}g and less.

== Personal life ==
Milgrom is married and has three daughters.

== See also ==
- Cosmic rays
- Gamma-ray burst
- Gamma ray and x-ray sources.
