= Scalar field dark matter =

Conjectured dark matter in cosmology

Pie chart showing the fractions of energy in the universe contributed by different sources. Ordinary matter is divided into luminous matter (the stars and luminous gases and 0.005% radiation) and nonluminous matter (intergalactic gas and about 0.1% neutrinos and 0.04% supermassive black holes). Ordinary matter is uncommon. Modeled after Ostriker and Steinhardt. For more information, see NASA.

In astrophysics and cosmology scalar field dark matter is a classical, minimally coupled, scalar field postulated to account for the inferred dark matter.

== Background ==
The universe may be accelerating, fueled perhaps by a cosmological constant or some other field possessing long range 'repulsive' effects. A model must predict the correct form for the large scale clustering spectrum, account for cosmic microwave background anisotropies on large and intermediate angular scales, and provide agreement with the luminosity distance relation obtained from observations of high redshift supernovae. The modeled evolution of the universe includes a large amount of unknown matter and energy in order to agree with such observations. This energy density has two components: cold dark matter and dark energy. Each contributes to the theory of the origination of galaxies and the expansion of the universe. The universe must have a critical density, a density not explained by baryonic matter (ordinary matter) alone.

== Scalar field ==
The dark matter can be modeled as a scalar field using two fitted parameters, mass and self-interaction. In this model the dark matter consists of an ultralight particle with a mass of ~10^{−22} eV when there is no self-interaction. If there is a self-interaction a wider mass range is allowed. The uncertainty in position of a particle is larger than its Compton wavelength (a particle with mass 10^{−22} eV has a Compton wavelength of 1.3 light years), and for some reasonable estimates of particle mass and density of dark matter there is no point talking about the individual particles' positions and momenta. By some dynamical measurements, we can deduce that the mass density of the dark matter is about $0.4 \ GeV \ cm^{-3}$. One can calculate the average separation between these particles by deducing the de-Broglie wavelength: $\lambda = 2 \pi/ mv$, here m is the mass of the dark matter particle and v is the dispersion velocity of the halo. The average number of the particles in cubic volume having the dimension equal to the de Broglie wavelength, $\lambda^3$ is given by, $N_{db} = \left(\frac{34 eV}{m}\right)^4 \left(\frac{250 km/s}{v}\right)^3$

The occupation number of these particles is so huge that we can consider the wave nature of these particles in the classical description. To satisfy Pauli's exclusion principle the particle must be bosons especially spin zero (scalar) particles, hence these ultra-light dark matter would be more like a wave than a particle, and the galactic halos are giant systems of condensed bose liquid, possibly superfluid. The dark matter can be described as a Bose–Einstein condensate of the ultralight quanta of the field and as boson stars. The enormous Compton wavelength of these particles prevents structure formation on small, subgalactic scales, which is a major problem in traditional cold dark matter models. The collapse of initial over-densities is studied in the references. There are not many models in which we consider dark matter as the scalar field. Axion-like particle (ALP) in string theory can be considered as a model of scalar field dark matter, as its mass density satisfies the relic density of the dark matter. The most common production mechanism of ALP is misalignment mechanism. Which shows the mass around $(10^{-22} -10^{-20})\ eV$ satisfies with the relic abundance of observed dark matter.

This dark matter model is also known as BEC dark matter or wave dark matter. Fuzzy dark matter and ultra-light axion are examples of scalar field dark matter.

== See also ==
- Weakly interacting massive particles – Hypothetical particles that may constitute dark matter
- Minimal Supersymmetric Standard Model – Simplest supersymmetric extension to the Standard Model
- Neutralino – Neutral mass eigenstate formed from superpartners of gauge and Higgs bosons
- Axion – Hypothetical elementary particle
- Dark matter halo – Theoretical cosmological structure
- Light dark matter – Dark matter weakly interacting massive particles candidates with masses less than 1 GeV
- Hot dark matter – Theoretical form of dark matter particles which travel near the speed of light
- Warm dark matter – Hypothesized form of dark matter
- Fuzzy cold dark matter – Hypothetical form of cold dark matter proposed to solve the cuspy halo problem
