= Direct detection of dark matter =

Direct detection of dark matter is the science of attempting to directly measure dark matter collisions in Earth-based experiments. Modern astrophysical measurements, such as from the cosmic microwave background, strongly indicate that 85% of the matter content of the universe is unaccounted for. Although the existence of dark matter is widely believed, what form it takes or its precise properties has never been determined. There are three main avenues of research to detect dark matter: attempts to make dark matter in accelerators, indirect detection of dark matter annihilation, and direct detection of dark matter in terrestrial labs. The founding principle of direct dark matter detection is that since dark matter is known to exist in the local universe, as the Earth, Solar System, and the Milky Way Galaxy carve out a path through the universe they must intercept dark matter, regardless of what form it takes.

== Mass range ==
The theoretical bounds for the supposed mass of dark matter are immense, from 10^{−21} eV for ultra-light dark matter to about that of a Solar Mass for Massive compact halo object. The lower limit of dark matter is constrained by the knowledge that dark matter exists in dwarf galaxies. From this knowledge a lower constraint is put on the mass of dark matter, as any less massive dark matter would have a de Broglie wavelength too massive to fit inside observed dwarf galaxies. On the other end of the spectrum the upper limit of dark matter mass is constrained experimentally; gravitational microlensing using the Kepler telescope attempted to detect MACHOs (MAssive Compact Halo Objects). Null results of this experiment exclude any dark matter candidate more massive than about a solar mass. As a result of this extremely vast parameter space, there exist a wide variety of proposed types of dark matter, in addition to a broad assortment of proposed experiments and methods to detect them. The spectrum of proposed dark matter matter mass is split into three broad, loosely defined categories as follows:

1. In the range of zepto-electronvolts (zeV) to 1 eV theories predict a bosonic or field like dark matter. The primary dark matter candidate in the range are axions, or axion-like particles.
2. From about 1 eV to the Planck Mass, dark matter is projected to be fermionic or particle-like. Favorites in this range include WIMPS, thermal relics, and sterile neutrinos.
3. Finally, in the mass range between the Planck Mass to masses on the order of the Solar mass, dark matter would be a composite particle. The leading theory for composite dark matter are primordial black holes.

== Bosonic / field dark matter ==
Any dark matter candidate with a mass less than approximately 1 eV and greater than 1 zeV is projected to be bosons, or a field, as opposed to a more traditional particle. Any lesser mass could not fit its de Broglie wavelength into dwarf galaxies.

=== Axions ===
Axions are theoretical, as of yet undiscovered, subatomic particles originally proposed in 1977 to solve inconsistencies in the Standard Model, i.e. the strong CP problem. A consequence of this solution is to generate an axion field, which would in turn indicate a cosmological abundance of axions that depend on the mass of the axion. If the axion mass is heavier than 5 μeV/c^{2}, then axions could account for all dark matter phenomena.

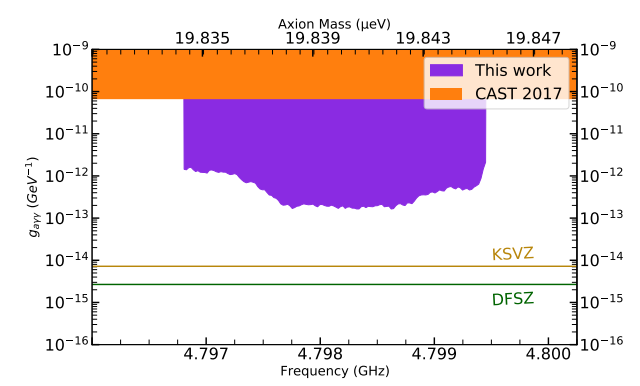
The parameter space excluded by the 2021 ADMX research results.

One of the only experiments to detect axions as dark matter is the Axion Dark Matter Experiment (ADMX). Located at the University of Washington, ADMX uses a resonant microwave cavity in a strong magnetic field to convert dark matter into microwave photons by means of the Primakoff effect. Microwave cavities are simple electrical devices that are built to resonate at extremely precise frequencies to create standing microwaves inside of the cavity. ADMX uses this technology to tune their microwave cavity to the resonance of axions located in the Milky Way halo. The purpose of this is to increase the interaction of axions with the high strength eight Tesla magnetic field present to better facilitate the Primakoff effect. The Primakoff effect is an as-yet unproven mechanism for the production of mesons from high energy interactions of photons with a nucleus. Axions qualify for this interaction, meaning that infamously undetectable dark matter could theoretically be converted into mundane photons. Although ADMX has yet to detect dark matter, its capabilities are promising. The experiment is capable of probing previously difficult to reach sections of the parameter space. The primary downside of the ADMX experiment is that the microwave cavity requires very fine tuning, meaning only a minuscule amount of the parameter space is probed at a time.

=== Weakly Interacting slim particles (WISPs) ===
Weakly Interacting Slim Particles (WISPs) are a broader category of particles with extremely small masses and interaction cross sections, of which axions are a member. Active neutrinos are the only WISP confirmed to exist, although they have been definitively ruled out as a dark matter candidate. In common usage, WISP is generally used to refer to any non axion ultra light dark matter particle. Leading theories suggest that such particles would interact with the standard model largely through coupling to photons, and would survive to the modern era after creation in the early universe.

== Fermionic / particle dark matter ==
Dark matter masses between 1 eV and the Planck Mass are hypothesized to be fermionic particles.

=== Weakly interacting massive particles ===
Weakly Interacting Massive Particles (WIMPs) are a broad category of theoretical particles, that interact not at all or very weakly with all forces except gravity. WIMPs are a member of a broader category of particles called thermal relics, particles which were created thermally in the early universe, as opposed to being created non-thermally later during a phase transition. As with all dark matter candidates, interaction probability is extraordinarily low, leading to a variety of techniques to be developed.

==== Experimental techniques ====
Direct detection of dark matter is based upon the premise that since it is known that dark matter exists in some form, Earth must intercept some as it carves out a path through the universe. Direct detection experiments attempt to create highly sensitive systems capable of detecting these rare and weak events.

===== Cryogenic crystal detectors =====
Cryogenic Crystal Detectors use disks of germanium and silicon cooled to around 50 millikelvin. These disks are coated in either tungsten or aluminum. An interacting WIMP would in theory excite the crystal lattice, sending vibrations to the surface, which is held precisely at its superconductivity threshold. Due to this the coating material's resistivity is highly dependent on heat, enough so that the energy deposited by the vibration is detectable.

One such detector is the Cryogenic Rare Event Search with Superconducting Thermometers (CRESST) located at the Gran Sasso National Laboratory in Assergi, Italy. Operating in multiple generations since 2000 CRESST has continually been evolving and improving its sensitivity range, although it has not yet definitively detected dark matter. As a notable side achievement, CRESST was the first experiment to detect the alpha decay of tungsten-180. The most recent generation of CRESST has enhanced its capabilities to detect WIMP dark matter as light as 160 MeV/c^{2}.

===== Noble gas scintillators =====
Noble gas scintillators use the property of certain materials to scintillate, which is when a material absorbs energy from a particle and remits the same amount of energy as light. Of particular interest for dark matter detection is the use of noble gases, even more specifically liquid xenon.

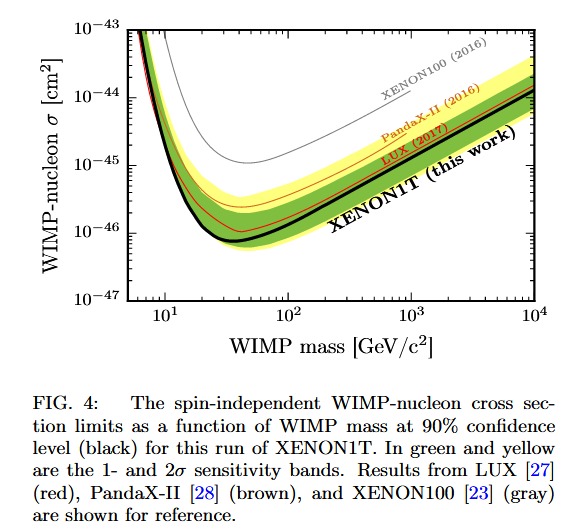
Upper limit for spin-independent WIMP-nucleon cross section according to XENON1T data (published Nov. 2017)

The XENON series of experiments, also located at the Gran Sasso National Lab, is a forefront user of liquid xenon scintillators. Common across all generations of the experiment, the detector consists of a tank of liquid xenon with a gaseous layer on top. At the top and bottom of the detector is a layer of photomultiplier tubes (PMTs). When a dark matter particle collides with the liquid xenon, it rapidly releases a photon which is detected by the PMTs. To cross reference this data point an electric field is applied which is sufficiently large to prevent complete recombination of the electrons knocked loose by the interaction. These drift to the top of the detector and are also detected, creating two separate detections for each event. Measuring the time delay between these allows for a complete 3-D reconstruction of the interaction. The detector is also able to discriminate between electronic recoils and nuclear recoils, as both types of events would produce differing ratios of the photon energy and the released electron energy.

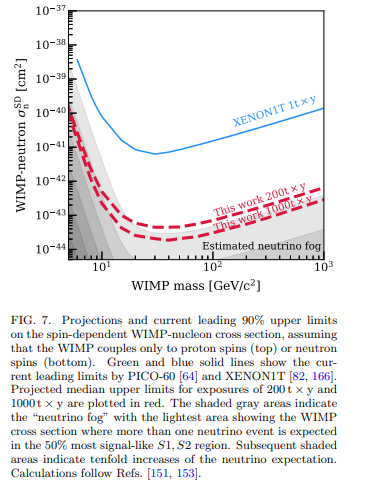
Projected WIMP mass and cross sections from XENONnT as compared to XENON1T.

The most recently completed version of the XENON experiment is XENON1T, which used 3.2 tons of liquid xenon. This experiment produced a then record limit for the cross section of WIMP dark matter of 4.1×10^{−47} cm^{2} at a mass of 30 GeV/c^{2}. The most recent iteration of the XENON succession is XENONnT, which is currently running with 8 tons of liquid xenon. This experiment is projected to be able to probe WIMP-nucleon cross sections of 1.4×10^{−48} cm^{2} for a 50 GeV/c^{2} WIMP mass. At this ultra-low cross section, interference from the background neutrino flux is predicted to be problematic.

===== Crystal scintillators =====
Crystal scintillator experiments are a middle ground between cryogenic crystal detectors and noble gas scintillators, using the crystals of the former and the scintillation properties of the latter. One such experiment that uses this technology is the DAMA/LIBRA experiment, once again located in the Gran Sasso National Laboratory in Italy. Unique to dark matter experiments DAMA/LIBRA attempts to measure an annual variation of the flux of dark matter. This concept is born from the knowledge that as the Earth's rotation comes in sync and out of sync of the Sun's motion through the Milky Way, the relative motion of a terrestrial detector to the dark matter halo would change, resulting in a differing flux of dark matter. DAMA/LIBRA has claimed to see such modulation, although the scientific community as a whole has yet to accept these results as valid. Disbelievers of this result claim that it is not due to a variation of WIMP flux, but rather due to uncontrolled seasonal changes. To test this other similar experiments, namely the Sodium-iodide with Active Background Rejection (SABRE) are being built in Gran Sasso and another instalment in Australia. The purpose of spreading out the experiments across both hemispheres is that if the modulation for the locations is in sync then that would positively indicate a change in the dark matter flux, whereas if the measured variations are six months out of sync, then that would indicate unaccounted for seasonal variations.

===== Bubble chambers =====
Bubble chambers, originally invented in 1952, are largely phased out but still have some use in WIMP dark matter detection. Bubble chambers are filled with superheated liquid held close to its phase transition. When a particle interacts with the superheated liquid the energy it imparts is enough to trigger a phase transition, causing any charged particles to leave an ionization trail of bubbles, which are detected. One such experiment that uses a bubble chamber is PICO, at SNOLAB in Canada. PICO was formed in 2013 as a combination of two previous similar experiments, PICASSO and COUPP. PICO employs a more advanced form of a bubble chamber, using individual droplets of a superheated gas, namely Freon, that are suspended in a gel matrix. The advantage of this setup is that the individual droplets slow down the phase transition, allowing for longer periods of detector activity. PICO currently has a 2-liter and a 60-liter detector, with a new version with a mass in the range of 250-500 liters being planned. Although PICO like all bubble chambers has fantastically low background noise, they are still detecting anomalous background events inconsistent with assumed dark matter characteristics. Additionally PICO was capable of ruling out interactions with unwanted iodine as the cause of the previously mentioned DAMA/LIBRA experiment's claimed dark matter modulation.

=== Sterile neutrinos ===
A Sterile neutrino is a theoretical type of neutrino that interacts only via gravity. The weak force only interacts with particles with left chirality, or left-handed neutrinos. Sterile neutrinos are proposed to be right handed, meaning they would only interact with gravity. Sterile neutrinos are viable dark matter candidates because they only interact via gravity, as is predicted for dark matter. Unfortunately, most current theories predict cold dark matter, meaning dark matter candidates that are non-relativistic. Due to their mass and energy, sterile neutrinos would be likely relativistic and thus count as hot dark matter. Sterile neutrinos could still be a constituent of dark matter, but it is highly unlikely that they are the only component.

== Composite dark matter ==
Dark matter mass between the Planck Mass and those on the order of the Solar Mass are hypothesized to be macroscopic composite objects. Masses much beyond the solar mass are ruled out observationally by the lack of gravitational microlensing events using the Kepler telescope.

=== Primordial black hole ===
Primordial black holes are black holes that formed very early in the universe, and without the collapse of a star. The theory behind primordial black holes is that in the extremely early universe, under one second, random fluctuations would cause local gravitational collapse into black holes. Since primordial black holes did not form from stellar collapse, they can have masses far below that of a solar mass, ranging from 10 micrograms to many solar masses. However, only primordial black holes with masses above 10^{11} kg would still exist today, as any less massive would have completely evaporated via Hawking radiation by the modern era.

Primordial black holes are plausible dark matter candidates, however arguments based upon their observed abundance cast doubt on their ability to be the only constituent of dark matter. Conversely, other research groups claim that gravitational waves detected by LIGO/VIRGO are consistent with primordial black holes making up 100% of dark matter, given if a relatively large amount of them were clustered within the halos of dwarf galaxies. An additional inconsistency with this claim is that the primordial black hole mass claimed could overlap with excluded mass range from Kepler micro-lensing.

The GAIA spacecraft, launched by the European Space Agency is tasked with creating the largest and most detailed map of space and all objects within it ever created, including possible composite dark matter candidates. Although not specifically searching for dark matter, it is possible that dark matter scientists will be able to find dark matter among the 1 billion objects it will catalogue during its lifetime.
