= Norma Sanchez =

Argentinian & French physicist and astronomer

Norma G. Sanchez
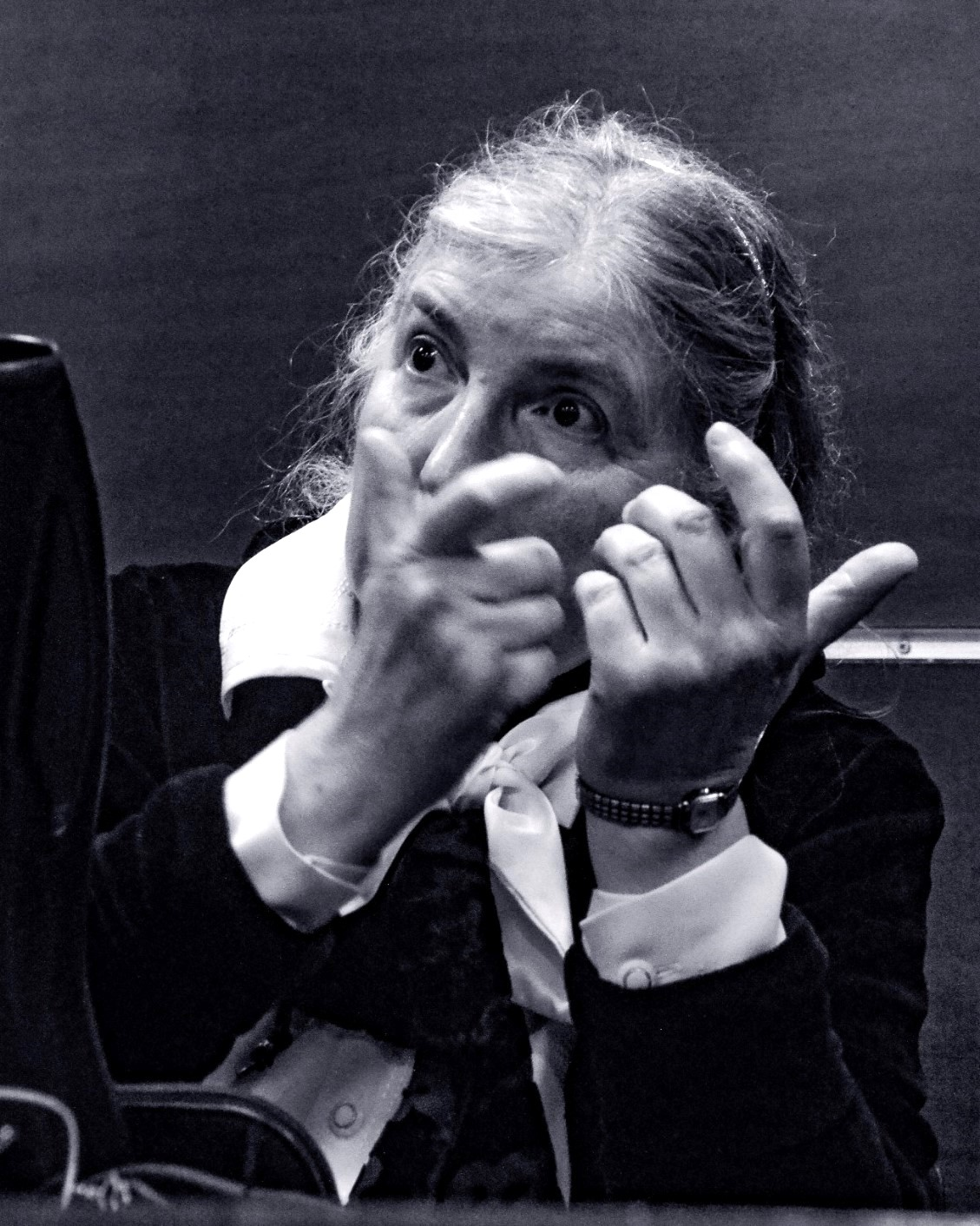
- Born: Norma Graciela Sanchez; Ensenada, Buenos Aires, Argentina
- Education: National University of La Plata (MSc, PhD); University of Paris (PhD)
- Known for: Black holes and Hawking radiation; Quantum field theory in curved space-time; String theory in gravity and cosmology; keV dark matter and galaxy structure
- Scientific career
- Fields: Theoretical physics, Astrophysics, Cosmology
- Workplaces: Paris Observatory; PSL Sorbonne University; French National Centre for Scientific Research (CNRS)
- Website: aramis.obspm.fr/~sanchez

Norma G. Sanchez is an Argentinian and French physicist with research expertise in theoretical physics, gravity, cosmology, particle physics, high-energy physics and quantum field and quantum theory. She is emeritus Professor of Physics and Director of Research at the French National Centre for Scientific Research (CNRS), Paris Observatory and PSL Sorbonne University.

Her work is on black holes, Hawking radiation, string theory in gravity and cosmology, effective inflation theory vs WMAP observations, keV dark matter and galaxy structure and theoretical models relating gravity and quantum physics. She is the founder and director of the International School Daniel Chalonge - Hector de Vega, inaugurated in the fall of 1991 by Nobel physicist S. Chandrasekhar.

== Early life and education ==
Born in the city of Ensenada, Buenos Aires, Argentina, her father Antonio Luis Sanchez de Martino worked in the chemistry-physics of Oil Industry, YPF, and her mother Norma Iris Piccoli di Tores in education and astronomy, Sanchez followed primary studies at the National School Hypolite Bouchard, pre-university studies at the School Normal National of girls N°1 Miss Mary O. Graham in the city of La Plata and completed her M.Sc. in Theoretical Physics at the Faculty of Exact Sciences, National University of La Plata, Argentina, on December 21, 1973.

She holds a Ph.D. in physics from the Faculty of Exact Sciences, National University of La Plata, Argentina, received in 1976 for the thesis Wave Scattering Theory by a Black-Hole and is a State Doctor in Physics, University of Paris, 1979 with a thesis On the Physics of Fields and the Geometry of Space-Time.

The film La Dama de la Ciencia (The Lady of Science) documents her life in Paris and Ensenada.

== Research and career ==
From 1973 to 1975, Sanchez was a teaching assistant at the National University of La Plata, Faculty of Exact Sciences and a researcher at the Council of Scientific Argentinian Research (CONICET), Institute of Astronomy and Space Science (IAFE), UBA campus, Buenos Aires.

In 1976, she joined the French National Center for Scientific Research (CNRS), as a researcher in theoretical physics, and is presently Research Director at CNRS. Between 1986 and 1987 Sanchez has a visiting appointment at CERN – Theory Division, Geneva, Switzerland and in 11988 at NORDITA – Niels Bohr Institute, Copenhagen, Denmark.

Early in her career, Sanchez worked on Wave Scattering and Absorption Theory by Black holes and a new approach to Quantum Field Theory in accelerated frames and curved space-times. Sanchez then began her lifelong collaboration with Hector de Vega, working on new approaches to string theory in gravity, cosmology and black holes. Their work continued on dark matter models, keV dark matter in particular (WDM), large scale structure, galaxy formation and particle physics.
