= Dwarf galaxy problem =

Unsolved problem in cosmology

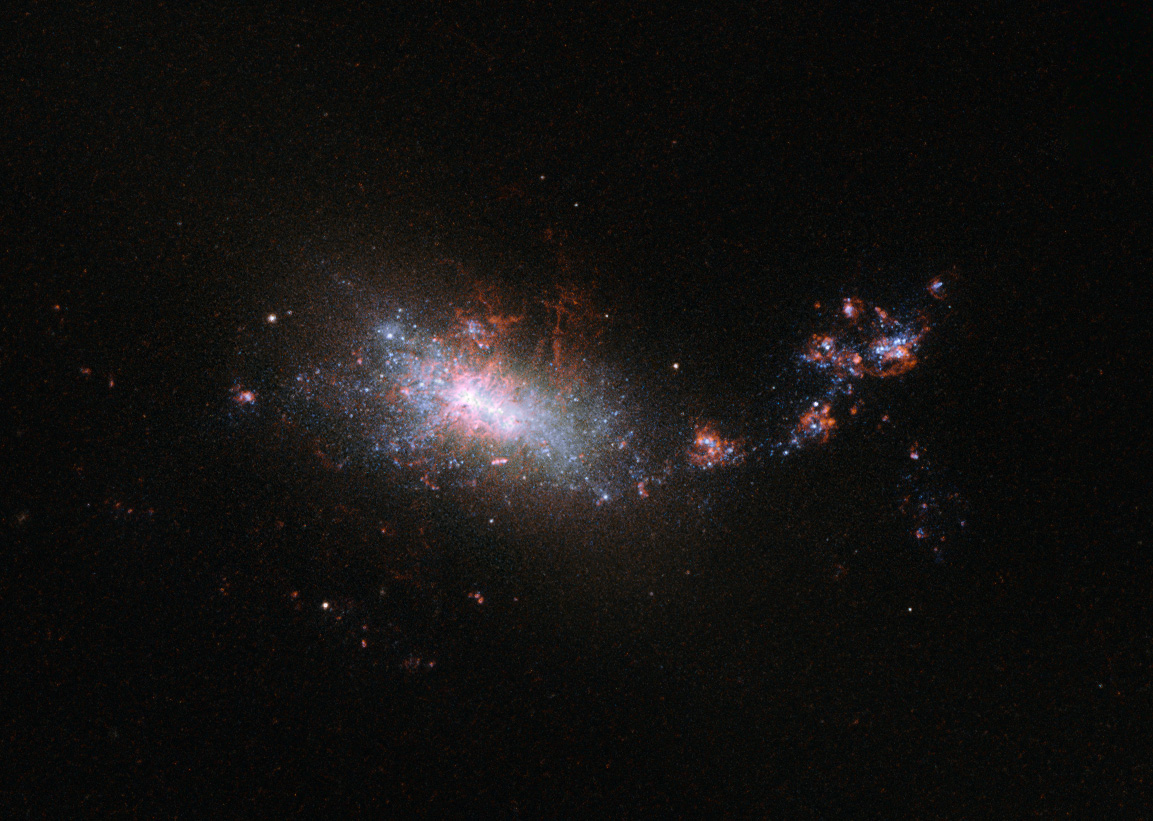
Dwarf galaxy NGC 1140.

The dwarf galaxy problem, also known as the missing satellites problem, arises from a mismatch between observed dwarf galaxy numbers and collisionless numerical cosmological simulations that predict the evolution of the distribution of matter in the universe. In simulations, dark matter clusters hierarchically, in ever increasing numbers of halo "blobs" as halos' components' sizes become smaller-and-smaller. However, although there seem to be enough observed normal-sized galaxies to match the simulated distribution of dark matter halos of comparable mass, the number of observed dwarf galaxies is orders of magnitude lower than expected from such simulation. Observations from 2024 suggest that this problem may be resolved for the Milky Way, but some simulations show that the problem of observing too few satellites still exists for other galaxies.

== Context ==
For example, around 38 dwarf galaxies have been observed in the Local Group, and only around 11 orbiting the Milky Way, (Note: For a detailed and up to date list see List of Milky Way's satellite galaxies.) yet dark matter simulations predict that there should be around 500 dwarf satellites for the Milky Way alone.

The dwarf galaxy problem still persists, but now there are too many observed instead of too few. Based on current simulations there should be around 220 satellite galaxies in the Milky Way, however discoveries in 2024 point the number to be around at least 500 satellites. While the problem may have been resolved for the Milky Way when taking the luminosity function (astronomy) into account, for some early-type galaxies fewer galaxies are being observed than the number predicted by simulations. The problem of finding too many galaxies may lie in the simulations used.This implies that simulations still need to be improved upon in order to solve the dwarf galaxy problem, not just for the Milky Way but for other galaxies. The Vera C. Rubin Observatory, which finished construction in 2024, will be conducting wide field surveys of the night skies, leading to discoveries which may help scientists better understand this issue.

== Prospective resolution ==
There are two main alternatives which may resolve the dwarf galaxy problem: The smaller-sized clumps of dark matter may be unable to obtain or retain the baryonic matter needed to form stars in the first place; or, after they form, dwarf galaxies may be quickly “eaten” by the larger galaxies that they orbit.

=== Baryonic matter too sparse ===
One proposal is that the smaller halos do exist but that only a few of them end up becoming visible, because they are unable to acquire enough baryonic matter to form a visible dwarf galaxy. In support of this, in 2007 the Keck telescopes observed eight newly discovered ultra-faint Milky Way dwarf satellites of which six were around 99.9% dark matter (with a mass-to-light ratio of about 1,000). Density profiles from 2022 suggest that dwarf galaxies have a constant-density core, though dark matter simulations suggest that there should be more baryon density.

=== Early demise of young dwarfs ===
The other popular proposed solution is that dwarf galaxies may tend to merge into the galaxies they orbit shortly after star-formation, or to be quickly torn apart and tidally stripped by larger galaxies, due to complicated orbital interactions.

Tidal stripping may also have been part of the problem of detecting dwarf galaxies in the first place: Finding dwarf galaxies is an extremely difficult task, since they tend to have low surface brightness and are highly diffuse – so much so that they are close to blending into background and foreground stars.

== See also ==
- Dark galaxy
- Cold dark matter
- Cuspy halo problem (also known as "the core/cusp problem")
- List of unsolved problems in physics
