= Indirect detection of dark matter =

Indirect detection of dark matter is a method of searching for dark matter that focuses on looking for the products of dark matter interactions (particularly Standard Model particles) rather than the dark matter itself. Contrastingly, direct detection of dark matter looks for interactions of dark matter directly with atoms. There are experiments aiming to produce dark matter particles using colliders. Indirect searches use various methods to detect the expected annihilation cross sections for weakly interacting massive particles (WIMPs). It is generally assumed that dark matter is stable (or has a lifetime long enough to appear stable), that dark matter interacts with Standard Model particles, that there is no production of dark matter post-freeze-out, and that the universe is currently matter-dominated, while the early universe was radiation-dominated. Searches for the products of dark matter interactions are profitable because there is an extensive amount of dark matter present in the universe, and presumably, a lot of dark matter interactions and products of those interactions (which are the focus of indirect detection searches); and many currently operational telescopes can be used to search for these products. Indirect searches help to constrain the annihilation cross section $\left \langle \sigma v \right \rangle,$ the lifetime of dark matter $\tau_X$, as well as the annihilation rate.

== Dark matter interactions ==
Indirect detection relies on the products of dark matter interactions. Thus, there are several different models of dark matter interactions to consider. Dark matter (DM) is often considered stable, as a lifetime greater than the age of the universe is required ( $\tau_X \gg 10^{10}$ yrs) for large amounts of DM to be present today. In fact, it seems that the abundance of DM has not changed significantly while the universe has been matter-dominated. Using measurements of the CMB and other large scale structures, the lifetime of DM can be roughly constrained by $\tau_X \gtrsim 2\times 10^{19}$s. Thus, annihilating DM is the focus of most indirect searches.

=== Annihilating dark matter ===
An annihilation cross section on the order of $\left \langle \sigma v \right \rangle\sim 10^{-26} cm^3s^{-1}$ is consistent with the measured cosmological density of DM. Thus, the objects of indirect searches are the secondary products that are expected from the annihilation of two dark matter particles. When observations of those secondary products reveal cross sections on the order of the expected $\sim 10^{-26}$ (or near that order of magnitude, with some expected or known discrepancy) the source of those products may become a dark matter candidate, or an indication of dark matter (an indirect signal). In general, the DM is expected to be $5 \ MeV \lesssim m_X \lesssim 120 \ TeV$ for the cross section given above.

Note that the "J-factor" of a given potential source of dark matter interaction products is the energy spectrum integrated along the line of sight, taking only the term dependent on the distribution of the DM mass density. For annihilation, that J-factor is commonly given as,

$J_{ann}=\frac{1}{8\pi}\int dr d\Omega \rho(\bar{r})^2$

where $\rho(\bar{r})$ is the mass density of DM. The J-factor is essentially a predictive measurement of a potential annihilation signal. The J-factor depends on the density, so if the density of a given region is not well-known or well-defined, then it can be difficult to determine the size of the expected signal. For example, since it is difficult to distinguish and remove backgrounds near the galactic center the calculated J-factor for that region varies by several orders of magnitude, depending on the density profile used.

=== Decaying dark matter ===
However, if DM is unstable, it would decay and produce decay products that could be observed. Since decay only involves one DM particle (while annihilation requires two), the flux of DM decay products is proportional to the DM density, $\rho_X$, rather than $\rho_X^2$ in the case of annihilation. There have been efforts to search for DM decay products in gamma rays, X-rays, cosmic rays, and neutrinos. For unstable dark matter of mass in the GeV–TeV range, the decay products are high-energy photons. These photons contribute to the extragalatic gamma ray background (EGRB). Studies of the EGRB using the Fermi satellite have revealed constraints on the lifetime of dark matter as $\tau_X > 10^{28}$ s, for masses between about 100 GeV and 1 TeV. The constraints derived from the EGRB are relatively unaffected by additional astrophysical uncertainties. NuSTAR observations have been used to search for X-ray lines to further constrain decaying DM for masses in the 10 to 50 keV range. For sterile neutrinos, there are several existing constraints based on X-ray limits. For DM masses $m_X \lesssim 10$ keV and $m_X \gtrsim 50$ keV, there are well-defined constraints on the mixing angle, $\theta$. Neutrinos have been used to derive constraints for DM masses in the range $10^3 \lesssim m_X \lesssim 10^6$ GeV. Combined data from Fermi gamma-ray observations and IceCube neutrino observations give constraints depending on energy and defined by the criterion, $N_{sig}/\sqrt{N_{sig}+N_{bkg}} < \delta$, with $N_{sig}$ defined as the given signal, $N_{bkg}$ as the muon neutrino background, and $\delta$ as the Gaussian significance. For low energies, the constraints improve with time as $\sim \sqrt{t}$. For high energies, the constraints are not well-defined, as neutrino flux is no longer dominant. Thus, there are constraints on the properties of decaying DM for masses $m_X$ ranging from keV to TeV. Additionally, in the case of decay, the signal strength (like J-factor for the case of annihilation) is dependent only on density, rather than density squared: $\int \rho(\bar{r})drd\Omega$. For sufficiently distant sources, the signal strength can then be approximated as $M/R^2$, where $M$ is the source mass.

== Methods of indirect detection ==
There are currently many different avenues through which indirect searches for dark matter may be carried out. In general, indirect detection searches focus on either gamma-rays, cosmic-rays, or neutrinos. There are many instruments that have been used in efforts to detect dark matter annihilation products, including H.E.S.S., VERITAS, and MAGIC (Cherenkov telescopes), Fermi Large Area Telescope (LAT), High Altitude Water Cherenkov Experiment (HAWC), and Antares, IceCube, and SuperKamiokande (neutrino telescopes). Each of these telescopes participates in the search for a signal from WIMPs, focusing, respectively, on sources ranging from the Galactic center or galactic halo, to galaxy clusters, to dwarf galaxies, depending on allowable energy range for each instrument. A DM annihilation signal has not yet been confirmed, and instead, constraints are placed on DM particles through limits on the annihilation cross section of WIMPs, on the lifetime of dark matter (in the case of decay), as well as on the annihilation rate and flux.

=== WIMP annihilation limits ===
==== Gamma-ray searches ====
In order to detect or constrain the properties of dark matter, observations of dwarf galaxies have been carried out. Limits may be placed on the annihilation cross section of WIMPs based on analysis of either gamma-rays or cosmic rays. The VERITAS, MAGIC, Fermi, and H.E.S.S. telescopes are among those that have been involved in the observation of gamma-rays. The air Cherenkov telescopes (H.E.S.S., MAGIC, VERITAS) are most effective at constraining the annihilation cross section for high energies ($E_{\gamma} > 100$ GeV).

For energies below 100 GeV, Fermi is more effective, as this telescope is not constrained to a view of only a small portion of the sky (as the ground-based telescopes are). From six years of Fermi data, which observed dwarf galaxies in the Milky Way, the DM mass is constrained to $m_X \gtrsim 100$ GeV (masses both this threshold are not allowed). Then, combining data from Fermi and MAGIC, the upper limit of the cross section is found to be $\left \langle \sigma v \right \rangle \sim 10^{-25}cm^3s^{-1}$ (that is, with no uncertainties in $J$. This collaboration produced constraints for DM masses in the range $10\ GeV \lesssim m_X \lesssim 100\ TeV$. Note that Fermi data dominates for the low mass end of the range, while MAGIC dominates for the high masses.

VERITAS has been used to observe high energy gamma-rays in the range 85 GeV to 30 TeV, for the mass range $10 \ GeV \lesssim m_X \lesssim 10 \ TeV$.

A 2026 paper analyzing Fermi data reported a 43.2 GeV emission line from three galaxy clusters.

==== Cosmic-ray searches ====
Cosmic ray analyses primarily observe positrons and antiprotons. The AMS experiment is one such project, providing data on cosmic ray electrons and positrons in the 0.5 GeV to 350 GeV range. AMS data allows for constraints on DM masses $m_X \lesssim 300$ GeV. Results from AMS constrain the annihilation cross section to $\left \langle \sigma v \right \rangle \lesssim 1.1 \times 10^{-24} cm^3s^{-1}$ for DM masses $\sim 100$ GeV (with the thermally averaged cross section noted as $\left \langle \sigma v \right \rangle_{therm} \equiv 3 \times 10^{-26}$ $cm^3s^{-1}$). The upper limit for the annihilation cross section can also be used to find a limit for the decay width of a DM particle. These analyses are also subject to substantial uncertainty, particularly pertaining to the Sun's magnetic field, as well as the production cross section for antiprotons.

=== Galactic center ===
The galactic center is hypothesized to be a source of large amounts of dark matter annihilation products. However, the background at the galactic center is both bright and not yet well understood (based on the model of the Milky Way in use, the flux of annihilation products can vary by several orders of magnitude). The Galactic center is a unique source of high mass dark matter, which cannot be replicated in colliders. Thus, telescopes like Fermi and H.E.S.S. have observed the excess of gamma-rays coming from the galactic center, as backgrounds are lower for gamma-rays (and unknown backgrounds at the galactic center typically cause large uncertainties for dark matter searches). The annihilation cross section is consistent with the expected $\sim 10^{-26} cm^3 s^{-1}$, and thus, In the case that those excess gamma-rays are products of dark matter annihilation, they must originate from dark matter with a mass $40 \ GeV \lesssim m_X \lesssim 70 \ GeV$.

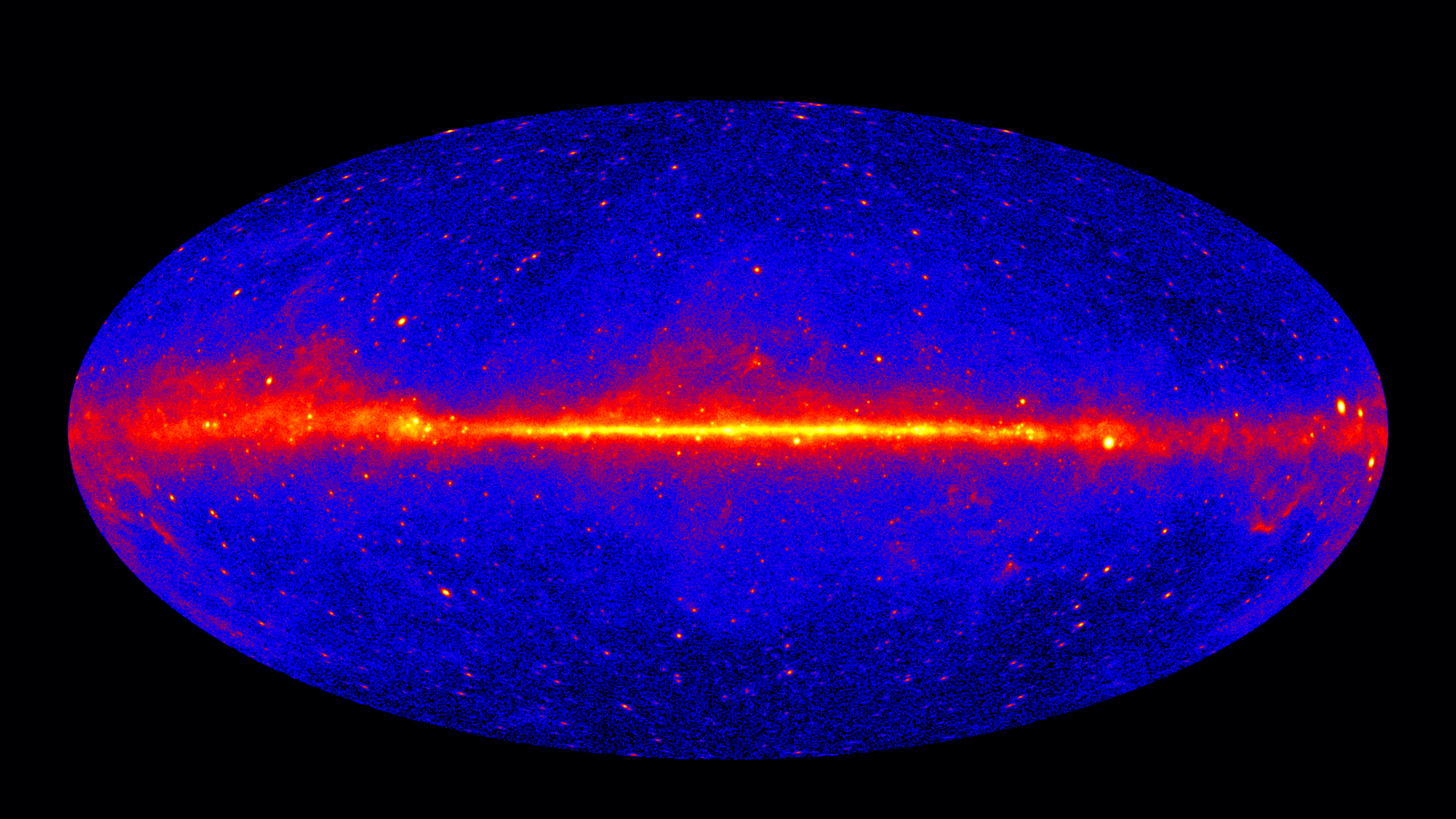
Full-sky image of gamma-rays greater than 1 GeV. For comparison, full-sky image of gamma-rays greater than 10 GeV.

H.E.S.S., an imaging atmospheric Cherenkov telescope, has been used to observe this excess of very high energy gamma-rays emanating from the galactic center. Probing energies in the range $E_{\gamma} \sim 500$ GeV to $25$ TeV, H.E.S.S. data allowed for limits on internal bremsstrahlung processes to be determined, which then allowed for upper limits on DM annihilation flux to be defined.

Overall, the galactic center is a focus for indirect searches due to its excess of gamma-rays. That excess has $\left \langle \sigma v \right \rangle \sim 10^{-26} cm^3 s^{-1}$ which is on the order of the thermally averaged annihilation cross section, making the gamma-ray excess a potential dark matter candidate.

=== Heavy dark matter ===
Heavy DM has $m_X \gg TeV$. Dark matter with mass in this regime is expected to result in high-energy photons that, through pair production, create a cascade of electrons and photons, eventually leading to low energy gamma-rays. Those low-energy gamma-rays can be observed by telescopes like Fermi, and then constrain the annihilation rate accordingly. Additionally, for decaying DM with masses greater than the TeV range, the lifetime is constrained to $\tau_X \gtrsim 10^{27-28}$ s.

=== Light dark matter ===
Contrastingly, light DM has $m_X \ll GeV$, and it becomes difficult to observe products for these lower masses and energies. Fermi is limited by its angular resolution, and cannot observe products below $\sim 1 \ GeV$. To observe products at the lower mass limit, either a low-energy gamma-ray telescope or an X-ray telescope is required.

=== Cosmic ray positron excess ===
An excess of positrons (in the flux ratio of positrons to electron and positron pairs) was found by PAMELA, in observing cosmic rays. Fermi and AMS-02 later confirmed this excess. One possible explanation for this excess of positrons is annihilating dark matter. For energies $\sim 10$ GeV to $300$ GeV, the ratio of positrons to electron-positron pairs continues to increase, indicating that the annihilating dark matter is producing positrons (and the flux increases with the DM mass). There are alternative explanations for this excess of positrons, including pulsars or supernova remnants. In 2017, data from the HAWC Collaboration indicated that the increase in flux of positrons from the two nearest pulsars (Geminga and Monogem) is roughly equivalent to the excess originally observed by PAMELA.

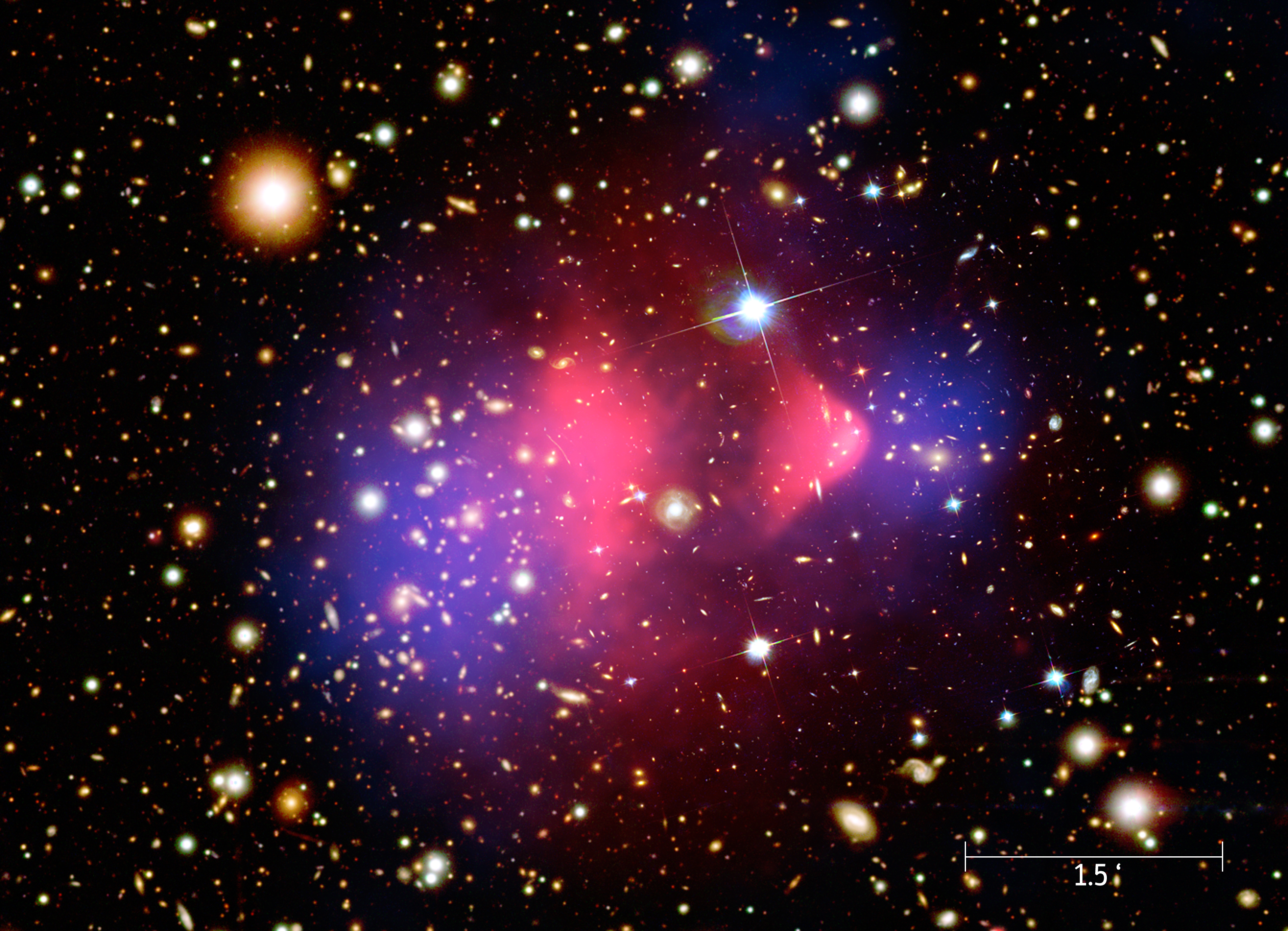
Dark matter shown in the Bullet Cluster.

=== The 3.5 keV line ===
In 2014, a spectral line an energy of $\sim 3.5$ keV was found in the observation of galaxy clusters. Further investigation of this spectral line by Chandra and XMM-Newton failed to find such a line, and thus, there is debate about whether the spectral line is evidence of dark matter. There are several explanations: (1) the source is a decaying sterile neutrino, with a mass $\sim 7$ keV (cold dark matter), and thus, is not subject to the constraints on warm dark matter. This explanation is consistent with observation of the spectral line at 3.5 keV, as expected, in both the cosmic X-ray background and the Galactic center, but inconsistent with the results from Chandra and XMM-Newton; (2) the source is heavier than 3.5 keV, but has a "metastable excited state" at 3.5 keV and a decay emits a photon of that same energy; (3) the DM source decays, producing a 3.5 keV axion-like particle, which could turn into a photon under some external magnetic field. The actual explanation cannot yet be confirmed. Thus, the 3.5 keV line remains as evidence of a potential DM candidate.

In 2023 a research preprint published on Arxiv questioned the existence of the 3.5 keV spectral line; the authors of the research, when trying to replicate the results pointing to the existence of the 3.5 keV spectral line failed to reproduce these results in five out of six cases, leading them to conclude:"We conclude that there is little robust evidence for the existence of the 3.5 keV line".

=== Cosmic microwave background ===
The cosmic microwave background (CMB) can also be analyzed in order to constrain dark matter annihilation products. If the number of dark matter annihilations is given as, $N_{ann} = \frac{1}{2}\frac{\rho_X^2\left \langle \sigma v \right \rangle V_c}{m_X^2 H}$

where $H$ is the expansion rate, $V_c$ is the comoving volume, and $\left \langle \sigma v \right \rangle$ is the averaged annihilation cross section, then the number of dark matter annihilations during both the period of matter-radiation equality and matter domination can be determined. From the above equation for number of dark matter annihilations, and based on a typical dark matter mass of $m_X = 100$ GeV, that dark matter would ionize a significant portion of hydrogen atoms (~$10^{-3}$) at the time of recombination. Thus, dark matter would have a noticeable effect on the CMB, as observed today.

Because the anisotropies found in the CMB are sensitive to any increase in energy, those anisotropies can be calculated under the assumption that the energy increase is due to some DM annihilation, in an effort to determine constraints on that DM annihilation. The Planck Collaboration used the relation

$p_{ann} \equiv f_{eff}\frac{\left \langle \sigma v \right \rangle}{m_X}$

(where $f_{eff}$ is the energy released into the intergalactic medium by a DM annihilation process) to determine a parameter, $p_{ann}$, to constrain DM annihilations based on CMB anisotropies and polarization. The Planck Collaboration found that CMB-constraints were more reliable than other methods for smaller masses (below ~10 GeV). CMB-constraints are also most reliable for any DM annihilation that results in either protons or electrons (that is, excluding annihilation into neutrinos).

== Alternative explanations ==
Some of the alternative explanations are mentioned in their respective sections above, but there are many alternative explanations for the sources various that are considered potential DM signal candidates. For example, the excess of gamma-rays at the galactic center could be due to pulsars near the galactic center, rather than dark matter. Additionally, as previously mentioned, the excess of cosmic-ray positrons could be due to nearby pulsars increasing the flux of positrons.

It should also be noted that it is possible for dark matter to annihilate with a cross section smaller than the thermally averaged value of $\sim 10^{-26}$, but current instrumentation does not allow for the investigation of such a model. Some of those additional models include velocity dependent processes, in which the cross section scales with the square of the relative velocity ($v_{rel}$) of the two annihilating dark matter particles $(\sigma v \propto v_{rel}^2)$. Another model is that of resonant annihilations, in which dark matter is assumed to annihilate near resonance, causing the cross section at the time of freeze-out to be significantly higher (or lower) than is observed today (due to the increased velocity at resonance, and the relatively low velocity assumed at present). Asymmetric dark matter is a model that suggests a primordial asymmetry in the abundance of dark matter particles and antiparticles.
