= Orders of magnitude (mass) =

Comparison of a wide range of masses

To help compare different orders of magnitude, the following lists describe various mass levels between 10^{−67} kilograms (kg) and 10^{52} kg. The least massive thing listed here is a graviton, and the most massive thing is the observable universe. Typically, an object having greater mass will also have greater weight (see mass versus weight), especially if the objects are subject to the same gravitational field strength.

== Units of mass ==
SI multiples of gram (g)
Submultiples			Multiples		
Value	SI symbol	Name	Value	SI symbol	Name
10^{−1} g	dg	decigram	10^{1} g	dag	decagram
10^{−2} g	**cg**	**centigram**	10^{2} g	hg	hectogram
10^{−3} g	**mg**	**milligram**	10^{3} g	**kg**	**kilogram**
10^{−6} g	**μg**	**microgram (mcg)**	10^{6} g	Mg	megagram (**tonne**)
10^{−9} g	**ng**	**nanogram**	10^{9} g	Gg	gigagram
10^{−12} g	pg	picogram	10^{12} g	Tg	teragram
10^{−15} g	fg	femtogram	10^{15} g	Pg	petagram
10^{−18} g	ag	attogram	10^{18} g	Eg	exagram
10^{−21} g	zg	zeptogram	10^{21} g	Zg	zettagram
10^{−24} g	yg	yoctogram	10^{24} g	Yg	yottagram
10^{−27} g	rg	rontogram	10^{27} g	Rg	ronnagram
10^{−30} g	qg	quectogram	10^{30} g	Qg	quettagram
Common prefixes are in bold face.

The table above is based on the kilogram, the base unit of mass in the International System of Units (SI). The kilogram is the only standard unit to include an SI prefix (kilo-) as part of its name. The gram (10^{−3} kg) is an SI derived unit of mass. However, the names of all SI mass units are based on gram, rather than on kilogram; thus 10^{3} kg is a megagram (10^{6} g), not a *kilokilogram.

The tonne (t) is an SI-compatible unit of mass equal to a megagram (Mg), or 10^{3} kg. The unit is in common use for masses above about 10^{3} kg and is often used with SI prefixes. For example, a gigagram (Gg) or 10^{9} g is 10^{3} tonnes, commonly called a kilotonne.

=== Other units ===
Other units of mass are also in use. Historical units include the stone, the pound, the carat, and the grain.

For subatomic particles, physicists use the mass-equivalent of an electronvolt (eV). At the atomic level, chemists use the mass of one-twelfth of a carbon-12 atom (the dalton). Astronomers use the mass of the sun (M_{☉}).

=== The least massive things: below 10^{−24} kg ===
Unlike other physical quantities, mass–energy does not have an a priori expected minimal quantity, or an observed basic quantum as in the case of electric charge. Planck's law allows for the existence of photons with arbitrarily low energies. Consequently, there can only ever be an experimental upper bound on the mass of a supposedly massless particle; in the case of the photon, this confirmed upper bound is of the order of 3×10^{−27} eV/c^{2} = 10^{−62} kg.

Factor (kg)	Value	Item
10^{−67}	1.07×10^{−67} kg	Graviton, upper bound (6×10^{−32} eV/c^{2})
10^{−40}	4.2×10^{−40} kg	Mass equivalent of the energy of a photon at the peak of the spectrum of the cosmic microwave background radiation (0.235 meV/c^{2})
10^{−36}	1.8×10^{−36} kg	1 eV/c^{2}, the mass equivalent of one electronvolt
10^{−36}	3.6×10^{−36} kg	Electron neutrino, upper limit on mass (2 eV/c^{2})
10^{−33} quectogram (qg)		
10^{−31}	9.11×10^{−31} kg	Electron (511 keV/c^{2}), the least massive elementary particle with a measured nonzero rest mass
10^{−30} rontogram (rg)	3.0–5.5×10^{−30} kg	Up quark (as a current quark), the least massive quark (1.7–3.1 MeV/c^{2})
10^{−28}	1.9×10^{−28} kg	Muon (106 MeV/c^{2})
10^{−27} yoctogram (yg)	1.661×10^{−27} kg	Dalton (Da), a.k.a. unified atomic mass unit (u)
10^{−27} yoctogram (yg)	1.673×10^{−27} kg	Proton (938.3 MeV/c^{2})
10^{−27} yoctogram (yg)	1.674×10^{−27} kg	Hydrogen atom, the lightest atom
10^{−27} yoctogram (yg)	1.675×10^{−27} kg	Neutron (939.6 MeV/c^{2})
10^{−27} yoctogram (yg)	3.168×10^{−27} kg	Tau (1.78 GeV/c^{2}), the most massive lepton
10^{−26}	1.2×10^{−26} kg	Lithium atom (6.941 Da)
10^{−26}	3.0×10^{−26} kg	Water molecule (18.015 Da)
10^{−26}	8.0×10^{−26} kg	Titanium atom (47.867 Da)
10^{−25}	1.1×10^{−25} kg	Copper atom (63.546 Da)
10^{−25}	1.6×10^{−25} kg	Z boson (91.2 GeV/c^{2})
10^{−25}	2.2×10^{−25} kg	Higgs boson (125 GeV/c^{2})
10^{−25}	3.1×10^{−25} kg	Top quark (173 GeV/c^{2}), the most massive known elementary particle
10^{−25}	3.2×10^{−25} kg	Caffeine molecule (194 Da)
10^{−25}	3.5×10^{−25} kg	Lead-208 atom
10^{−25}	4.9×10^{−25} kg	Oganesson-294 atom, the heaviest known nuclide

=== 10^{−24} to 10^{−18} kg ===
Factor (kg)	Value	Item
10^{−24} zeptogram (zg)	1.2×10^{−24} kg	Buckyball molecule (720 Da)
10^{−23}	1.4×10^{−23} kg	Ubiquitin, a small ubiquitous protein (8.6 kDa)
10^{−23}	5.5×10^{−23} kg	A typical protein (median size of roughly 300 amino acids ≈ 33 kDa)
10^{−22}	1.1×10^{−22} kg	Haemoglobin A molecule in blood (64.5 kDa)
10^{−21} attogram (ag)	1.65×10^{−21} kg	Double-stranded DNA molecule consisting of 1,578 base pairs (995 kDa)
10^{−21} attogram (ag)	4.3×10^{−21} kg	Prokaryotic ribosome (2.6 MDa)
10^{−21} attogram (ag)	7.1×10^{−21} kg	Eukaryotic ribosome (4.3 MDa)
10^{−21} attogram (ag)	7.6×10^{−21} kg	Brome mosaic virus, a small virus (4.6 MDa)
10^{−20}	3×10^{−20} kg	Synaptic vesicle in rats (16.1 ± 3.8 MDa)
10^{−20}	6.8×10^{−20} kg	Tobacco mosaic virus (41 MDa)
10^{−19}	1.1×10^{−19} kg	Nuclear pore complex in yeast (66 MDa)
10^{−19}	2.5×10^{−19} kg	Human adenovirus (150 MDa)

=== 10^{−18} to 10^{−12} kg ===
Factor (kg)	Value	Item
10^{−18} femtogram (fg)	1×10^{−18} kg	HIV-1 virus
10^{−18} femtogram (fg)	4.7×10^{−18} kg	DNA sequence of length 4.6 Mbp, the weight of the E. coli genome
10^{−17}	~1×10^{−17} kg	Vaccinia virus, a large virus
10^{−17}	1.1×10^{−17} kg	Mass equivalent of 1 joule
10^{−16}	3×10^{−16} kg	Prochlorococcus cyanobacteria, the smallest (and possibly most plentiful) photosynthetic organism on Earth
10^{−15} picogram (pg)	1×10^{−15} kg	E. coli bacterium (wet weight)
10^{−15} picogram (pg)	6×10^{−15} kg	DNA in a typical diploid human cell (approximate)
10^{−14}	2.2×10^{−14} kg	Human sperm cell
10^{−14}	6×10^{−14} kg	Yeast cell (quite variable)
10^{−13}	1.5×10^{−13} kg	Dunaliella salina, a green alga (dry weight)

=== 10^{−12} to 10^{−6} kg ===
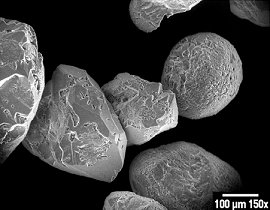
Scanning electron micrograph showing grains of sand

Factor (kg)	Value	Item
10^{−12} nanogram (ng)	1×10^{−12} kg	Average human cell (1 nanogram)
10^{−12} nanogram (ng)	2–3×10^{−12} kg	HeLa human cell
10^{−12} nanogram (ng)	8×10^{−12} kg	Grain of birch pollen
10^{−11}		
10^{−10}	2.5×10^{−10} kg	Grain of maize pollen
10^{−10}	3.5×10^{−10} kg	Very fine grain of sand (0.063 mm diameter, 350 nanograms)
10^{−9} microgram (μg)	3.6×10^{−9} kg	Human ovum
10^{−9} microgram (μg)	2.4×10^{−9} kg	US RDA for vitamin B12 for adults
10^{−8}	10^{−8} kg	Speculated approximate lower limit of the mass of a primordial black hole
10^{−8}	1.5×10^{−8} kg	US RDA for vitamin D for adults
10^{−8}	~2×10^{−8} kg	Uncertainty in the mass of the International Prototype of the Kilogram (IPK) (±~20 μg)
10^{−8}	2.2×10^{−8} kg	Planck mass, can be expressed as the mass of a 2 Planck Length radius black hole
10^{−8}	~7×10^{−8} kg	One eyelash hair (approximate)
10^{−7}	1.5×10^{−7} kg	US RDA for iodine for adults
10^{−7}	2–3×10^{−7} kg	Fruit fly (dry weight)

=== 10^{−6} to 1 kg ===
Factor (kg)	Value	Item
10^{−6} milligram (mg)	2.5×10^{−6} kg	Mosquitoes, common smaller species (about 2.5 milligrams), grain of salt or sand, medicines are typically expressed in milligrams
10^{−5} centigram (cg)	1.1×10^{−5} kg	Small granule of quartz (2 mm diameter, 11 milligrams)
10^{−5} centigram (cg)	2×10^{−5} kg	Adult housefly (Musca domestica, 21.4 milligrams)
10^{−4} decigram (dg)	0.27–2.0×10^{−4} kg	Range of amounts of caffeine in one cup of coffee (27–200 milligrams)
10^{−4} decigram (dg)	1.5×10^{−4} kg	A frame of 35mm motion picture film (157 milligrams)
10^{−4} decigram (dg)	2×10^{−4} kg	Metric carat (200 milligrams)
10^{−3} gram (g)	1×10^{−3} kg	One cubic centimeter of water (1 gram)
10^{−3} gram (g)	1×10^{−3} kg	US dollar bill (1 gram)
10^{−3} gram (g)	~1×10^{−3} kg	Two raisins (approximately 1 gram)
10^{−3} gram (g)	~8×10^{−3} kg	Coins of one euro (7.5 grams), one US dollar (8.1 grams) and one Canadian loonie (7 grams [pre-2012], 6.27 grams [2012-])
10^{−2} decagram (dag)	1.2×10^{−2} kg	Mass of one mole (6.02214×10^{23} atoms) of carbon-12 (12 grams)
10^{−2} decagram (dag)	1.37×10^{−2} kg	Amount of ethanol defined as one standard drink in the US (13.7 grams)
10^{−2} decagram (dag)	2–4×10^{−2} kg	Adult mouse (Mus musculus, 20–40 grams)
10^{−2} decagram (dag)	2.8×10^{−2} kg	Ounce (avoirdupois) (28.3495 grams)
10^{−2} decagram (dag)	4.7×10^{−2} kg	Mass equivalent of the energy that is 1 megaton of TNT equivalent
10^{−1} hectogram (hg)	0.1-0.2 kg	An orange (100–200 grams)
10^{−1} hectogram (hg)	0.142-0.149 kg	A baseball used in the major league.
10^{−1} hectogram (hg)	0.454 kg	Pound (avoirdupois) (453.6 grams)
10^{−1} hectogram (hg)	0.9 kg	Microraptor, a small, four-winged dinosaur

=== 1 kg to 10^{5} kg ===
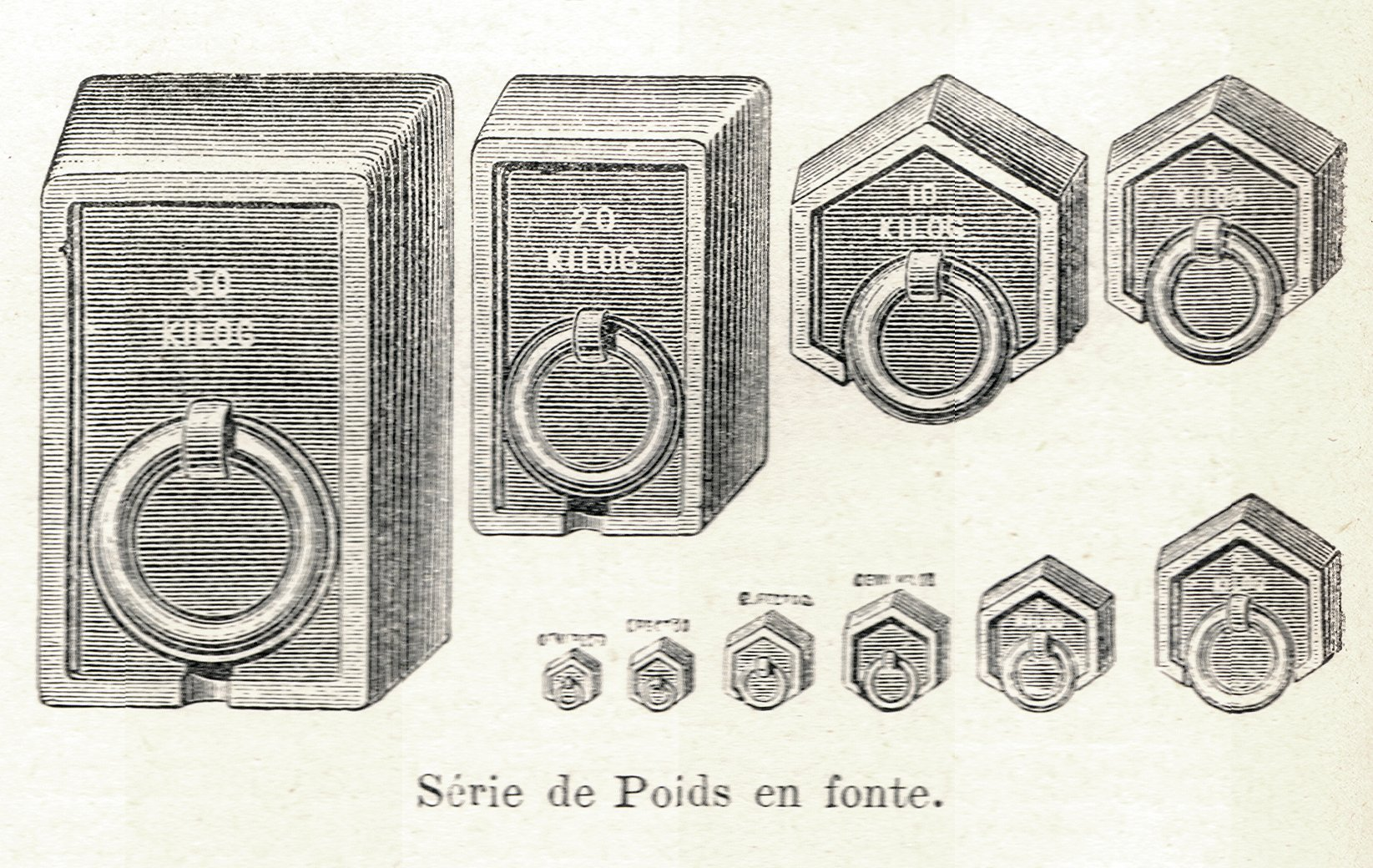
Iron weights up to 50 kilograms depicted in Dictionnaire encyclopédique de l'épicerie et des industries annexes.

Factor (kg)	Value	Item
1 kg kilogram (kg)	1 kg	One litre (0.001 m^{3}) of water
1 kg kilogram (kg)	1–3 kg	Smallest breed of dog (Chihuahua)
1 kg kilogram (kg)	1–3 kg	Typical laptop computer, 2010
1 kg kilogram (kg)	1–3 kg	Adult domestic tortoise
1 kg kilogram (kg)	2.5–4 kg	Newborn human baby
1 kg kilogram (kg)	4.0 kg	Women's shot
1 kg kilogram (kg)	4–5 kg	Housecat
1 kg kilogram (kg)	7.26 kg	Men's shot
10^{1}	9–27 kg	Medium-sized dog
10^{1}	31.5 kg	Average weight of a CRT television from 2007
10^{1}	50 kg	Large dog breed (Great Dane)
10^{1}	70 kg	Adult human
10^{2}	130–180 kg	Mature lion, female (130 kg) and male (180 kg)
10^{2}	200–250 kg	Giant tortoise
10^{2}	240–450 kg	Grand piano
10^{2}	400–900 kg	Dairy cow
10^{2}	500–500,000 kg	A teaspoon (5 ml) of white dwarf material (0.5–500 tonnes)
10^{2}	635 kg	Heaviest human in recorded history (Jon Brower Minnoch)
10^{2}	907.2 kg	1 short ton (2,000 pounds - US)
10^{3} megagram (Mg)	1000 kg	1 tonne (US spelling: metric ton)
10^{3} megagram (Mg)	1000 kg	1 cubic metre of water
10^{3} megagram (Mg)	1016.05 kg	Ton (British) / 1 long ton (2,240 pounds - US)
10^{3} megagram (Mg)	1300–1600 kg	Typical passenger cars
10^{3} megagram (Mg)	2700–6000 kg	Adult elephant
10^{4}	1.1×10^{4} kg	Hubble Space Telescope (11 tonnes)
10^{4}	1.2×10^{4} kg	Largest elephant on record (12 tonnes)
10^{4}	1.4×10^{4} kg	Big Ben (bell) (14 tonnes)
10^{4}	2.7×10^{4} kg	ENIAC computer, 1946 (30 tonnes)
10^{4}	4×10^{4} kg	Maximum gross mass (truck + load combined) of a semi-trailer truck in the EU (40–44 tonnes)
10^{4}	5×10^{4}–6×10^{4} kg	Tank; Bulldozer (50–60 tonnes)
10^{4}	6.0×10^{4} kg	Largest single-piece meteorite, Hoba West Meteorite (60 tonnes)
10^{4}	7.3×10^{4} kg	Largest dinosaur, Argentinosaurus (73 tonnes)
10^{5}	1.74-1.83×10^{5} kg	Operational empty weight of a Boeing 747-300
10^{5}	1.8×10^{5} kg	Largest animal ever, a blue whale (180 tonnes)
10^{5}	4.2×10^{5} kg	International Space Station (417 tonnes)
10^{5}	6×10^{5} kg	World's heaviest aircraft: Antonov An-225 (maximum take-off mass: 600 tonnes, payload: 250 tonnes)

=== 10^{6} to 10^{11} kg ===
Factor (kg)	Value	Item
10^{6} gigagram (Gg)	1×10^{6} kg	Trunk of the giant sequoia tree named General Sherman, largest living tree by trunk volume (1,121 tonnes)
10^{6} gigagram (Gg)	2.0×10^{6} kg	Launch mass of the Space Shuttle (2,041 tonnes)
10^{6} gigagram (Gg)	6×10^{6} kg	Largest clonal colony, the quaking aspen named Pando (largest living organism) (6,000 tonnes)
10^{6} gigagram (Gg)	7.8×10^{6} kg	Virginia-class nuclear submarine (submerged weight)
10^{7}	1×10^{7} kg	Annual production of Darjeeling tea
10^{7}	5.2×10^{7} kg	RMS Titanic when fully loaded (52,000 tonnes)
10^{7}	9.97×10^{7} kg	Heaviest train ever: Australia's BHP Iron Ore, 2001 record (99,700 tonnes)
10^{8}	6.6×10^{8} kg	Largest ship and largest mobile man-made object, Seawise Giant, when fully loaded (660,000 tonnes)
10^{8}	7×10^{8} kg	Heaviest (non-pyramid) building, Palace of the Parliament in Bucharest, Romania
10^{9} teragram (Tg)	4.3×10^{9} kg	Amount of matter converted into energy by the Sun each second
10^{9} teragram (Tg)	6×10^{9} kg	Great Pyramid of Giza
10^{10}	6×10^{10} kg	Amount of concrete in the Three Gorges Dam, the world's largest concrete structure
10^{11}	~1×10^{11} kg	The mass of a primordial black hole with an evaporation time equal to the age of the universe
10^{11}	2×10^{11} kg	Amount of water stored in London storage reservoirs (0.2 km^{3})
10^{11}	6×10^{11} kg	Total mass of the world's human population
10^{11}	5×10^{11} kg	Total biomass of Antarctic krill, one of the most plentiful animal species on the planet in terms of biomass

=== 10^{12} to 10^{17} kg ===
Factor (kg)	Value	Item
10^{12} petagram (Pg)	0.8–2.1×10^{12} kg	Global biomass of fish
10^{12} petagram (Pg)	4×10^{12} kg	Global annual human food production
10^{12} petagram (Pg)	4×10^{12} kg	World crude oil production in 2009 (3,843 Mt)
10^{12} petagram (Pg)	5.5×10^{12} kg	A teaspoon (5 ml) of neutron star material (5,000 million tonnes)
10^{13}	1×10^{13} kg	Mass of comet 67P/Churyumov–Gerasimenko
10^{13}	4×10^{13} kg	Global annual human carbon dioxide emission
10^{14}	1.05×10^{14} kg	Global net primary production – the total mass of carbon fixed in organic compounds by photosynthesis each year on Earth
10^{14}	7.2×10^{14} kg	Total carbon stored in Earth's atmosphere
10^{15} exagram (Eg)	2.0×10^{15} kg	Total carbon stored in the terrestrial biosphere
10^{15} exagram (Eg)	3.5×10^{15} kg	Total carbon stored in coal deposits worldwide
10^{16}	1×10^{16} kg	951 Gaspra, the first asteroid ever to be closely approached by a spacecraft (rough estimate)
10^{16}	1×10^{16} kg	Rough estimate of the total carbon content of all organisms on Earth.
10^{16}	3×10^{16} kg	Rough estimate of everything produced by the human species.
10^{16}	3.8×10^{16} kg	Total carbon stored in the oceans.
10^{17}	1.6×10^{17} kg	Prometheus, a shepherd satellite for the inner edge of Saturn's F Ring

=== 10^{18} to 10^{23} kg ===
Factor (kg)	Value	Item
10^{18} zettagram (Zg)	5.1×10^{18} kg	Earth's atmosphere
10^{18} zettagram (Zg)	5.6×10^{18} kg	Hyperion, a moon of Saturn
10^{19}	3×10^{19} kg	3 Juno, one of the larger asteroids in the asteroid belt
10^{19}	3×10^{19} kg	The rings of Saturn
10^{20}	9.4×10^{20} kg	Ceres, dwarf planet within the asteroid belt
10^{21} yottagram (Yg)	1.4×10^{21} kg	Earth's oceans
10^{21} yottagram (Yg)	1.5×10^{21} kg	Charon, the largest moon of Pluto
10^{21} yottagram (Yg)	2.9–3.7×10^{21} kg	The asteroid belt
10^{21} yottagram (Yg)	4×10^{21} kg	Haumea
10^{22}	1.3×10^{22} kg	Pluto
10^{22}	2.1×10^{22} kg	Triton, largest moon of Neptune
10^{22}	2.7×10^{22} kg	Earth's crust
10^{22}	7.3×10^{22} kg	Earth's Moon
10^{23}	1.3×10^{23} kg	Titan, largest moon of Saturn
10^{23}	1.5×10^{23} kg	Ganymede, largest moon of Jupiter
10^{23}	3.3×10^{23} kg	Mercury
10^{23}	6.4×10^{23} kg	Mars

=== 10^{24} to 10^{29} kg ===
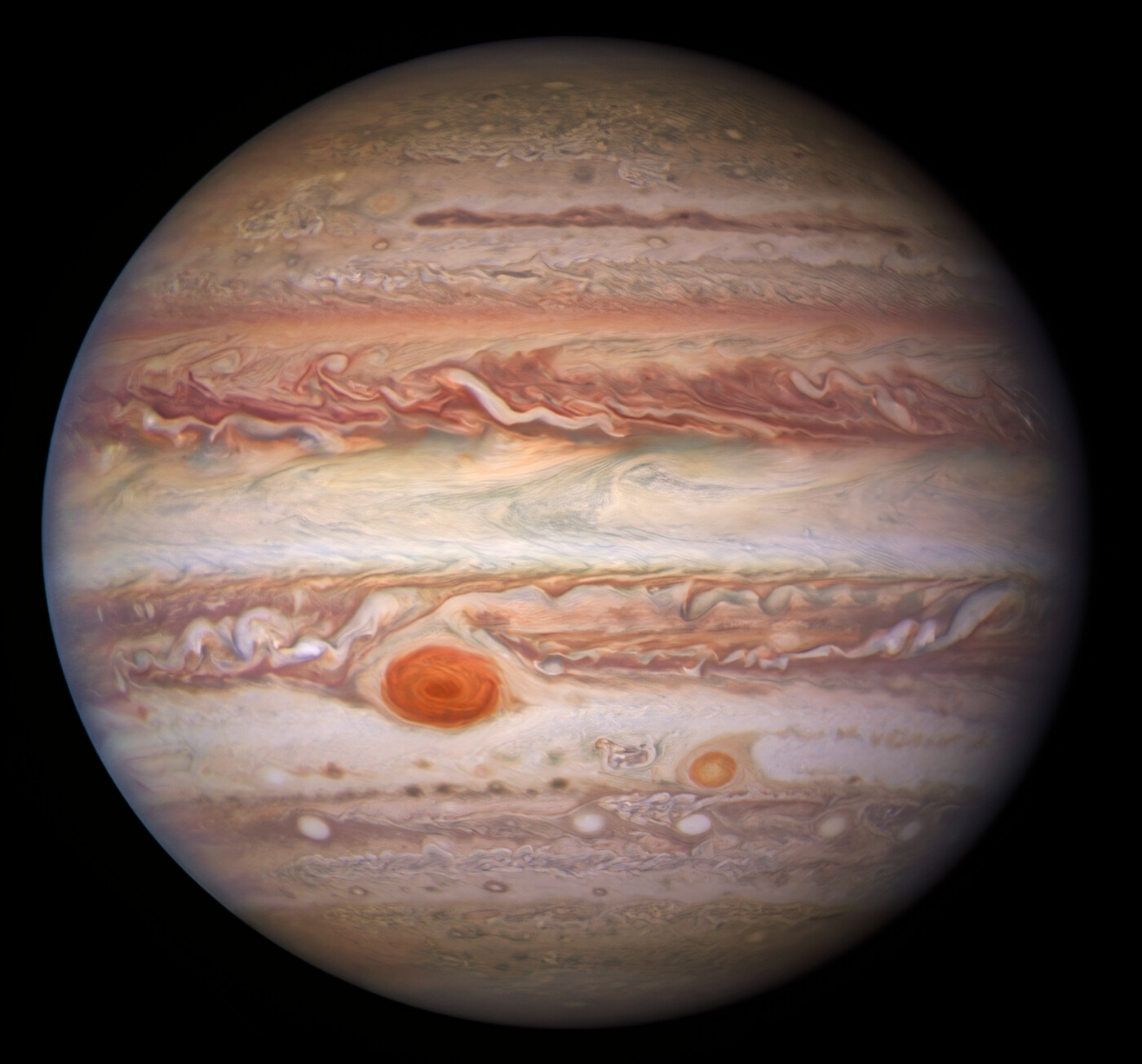
Jupiter is the most massive planet in the Solar System.

Factor (kg)	Value	Item
10^{24} ronnagram (Rg)	4.9×10^{24} kg	Venus
10^{24} ronnagram (Rg)	6.0×10^{24} kg	Earth
10^{25}	3×10^{25} kg	Oort cloud
10^{25}	8.7×10^{25} kg	Uranus
10^{26}	1.0×10^{26} kg	Neptune
10^{26}	5.7×10^{26} kg	Saturn
10^{27} quettagram (Qg)	1.9×10^{27} kg	Jupiter
10^{28}	2–14×10^{28} kg	Brown dwarfs (approximate)
10^{29}	3×10^{29} kg	Barnard's Star, a nearby red dwarf

=== 10^{30} to 10^{35} kg ===
Factor (kg)	Value	Item
10^{30}	2×10^{30} kg	The Sun (one solar mass or M_{☉} = 1.989×10^{30} kg)
10^{30}	2.8×10^{30} kg	Chandrasekhar limit (1.4 M_{☉})
10^{31}	4×10^{31} kg	Betelgeuse, a red supergiant star (20 M_{☉})
10^{32}	4–7×10^{32} kg	R136a1, the most massive of known stars (230 to 345 M_{☉})
10^{32}	6–8×10^{32} kg	Hyades star cluster (300 to 400 M_{☉})
10^{33}	1.6×10^{33} kg	Pleiades star cluster (800 M_{☉})
10^{34}		
10^{35}	~10^{35} kg	Typical globular cluster in the Milky Way (overall range: 3×10^{3} to 4×10^{6} M_{☉})
10^{35}	2×10^{35} kg	Low end of mass range for giant molecular clouds (1×10^{5} to 1×10^{7} M_{☉})
10^{35}	7.3×10^{35} kg	Jeans mass of a giant molecular cloud at 100 K and density 30 atoms per cubic centimeter; possible example: Orion molecular cloud complex

=== 10^{36} to 10^{41} kg ===
Factor (kg)	Value	Item
10^{36}	1.79×10^{36} kg	The entire Carina complex.
10^{36}	2.4×10^{36} kg	The Gould Belt of stars, including the Sun (1.2×10^{6} M_{☉})
10^{36}	7–8×10^{36} kg	The supermassive black hole at the center of the Milky Way, associated with the radio source Sagittarius A* (3.7±0.2×10^{6} M_{☉})
10^{36}	8×10^{36} kg	Omega centauri, the largest globular cluster in the Milky Way, containing approximately 10 million stars.
10^{37}		
10^{38}		
10^{39}		
10^{40}		
10^{41}	1.98×10^{41} kg	Phoenix A, the largest supermassive black hole, weighing 100 billion solar masses (1×10^{11} M_{☉})
10^{41}	4×10^{41} kg	Visible mass of the Milky Way galaxy

=== The most massive things: 10^{42} kg and greater ===
Factor (kg)	Value	Item
10^{42}	1.2×10^{42} kg	Milky Way galaxy (5.8×10^{11} M_{☉})
10^{42}	2–3×10^{42} kg	Local Group of galaxies, including the Milky Way (1.29±0.14×10^{12} M_{☉})
10^{43}	5.37×10^{43} kg	ESO 146-5, the heaviest known galaxy in the universe
10^{44}		
10^{45}	1–2×10^{45} kg	Local or Virgo Supercluster of galaxies, including the Local Group (1×10^{15} M_{☉})
10^{46}		
10^{47}	2×10^{47} kg	Laniakea Supercluster of galaxies, which encompasses the Virgo supercluster
10^{48}	2×10^{48} kg	Pisces–Cetus Supercluster Complex, a galaxy filament that includes the Laniakea Supercluster.
10^{49}	4×10^{49} kg	Hercules–Corona Borealis Great Wall, the largest structure in the known universe
10^{50}		
10^{51}		
10^{52}	4.4506×10^{52} kg	Mass of the observable universe as estimated by NASA
10^{52}	1.4×10^{53} kg	Mass of the observable universe as estimated by the US National Solar Observatory

== See also ==
- Lists of astronomical objects
