= Meta-cold dark matter =

Meta-cold dark matter (mCDM) is a form of cold dark matter proposed to solve the cuspy halo problem. It consists of particles "that emerge relatively late in cosmic time (z ≲ 1000) and are born non-relativistic from the decays of cold particles".
