= 2cDM model of dark matter =

Theoretical model of dark matter

The 2cDM model, or two-component dark matter model, is a type of beyond-the-standard-model (BSM) theory that proposes the existence of two different types of dark matter components in cosmology. Unlike the standard cold dark matter (CDM) model, which assumes a single type of dark matter particle, a 2cDM model suggests that dark matter may consist of two distinct particle species, each with its own properties and interactions.

Multi-component models like 2cDM may help solve known problems in cosmology on a small scale, including the problems and structure of dark matter.

However, similar to other BSM theories, the 2cDM model require precise tuning of parameters to match observations. While less severe than the hierarchy problem, this fine-tuning raises questions about their naturalness.

== Features of the 2cDM model ==
=== Two components ===
A 2cDM type model posits that dark matter is made up of two different types of particles, which may have different masses, interactions, and other properties.

The two components used can differ depending on the approach. One example involves a singlet fermion and a singlet scalar, both stabilized by a single Z_{4} symmetry. In this model, the scalar particle interacts with Standard Model particles through the Higgs-boson, while the fermion interacts directly with the scalar via Yukawa interaction.

Other two-component theories have been proposed, such as the use of two scalar fields to model dark matter.

=== Motivation ===
The 2cDM model is motivated by the need to address certain discrepancies and challenges in cosmology and astrophysics that cannot be fully explained by the Standard CBM model. For instance, it may help in explaining the distribution of dark matter in small-scale structures, such as galaxies and galaxy clusters.

=== Interactions ===
The two components in the 2cDM model might interact with each other or with ordinary matter in different ways. These interactions can influence the formation and evolution of cosmic structures.

=== Flexibility ===
By allowing for two types of dark matter, the model provides greater flexibility in fitting observational data, such as the cosmic microwave background radiation, galaxy rotation curves, and large-scale structure of the universe.
