= Mixed dark matter =

Mixed dark matter (MDM) is a dark matter (DM) model proposed during the late 1990s.

Mixed dark matter is also called hot and cold dark matter. The most abundant form of dark matter is cold dark matter, almost one fourth of the energy contents of the universe. Neutrinos are the only known particles whose Big-Bang thermal relic should compose at least a fraction of hot dark matter (HDM), albeit other candidates are speculated to exist. In the early 1990s, the power spectrum of fluctuations in the galaxy clustering did not agree entirely with the predictions for a standard cosmology built around pure cold DM. Mixed dark matter with a composition of about 80% cold and 20% hot (neutrinos) was investigated and found to agree better with observations. This large amount of HDM was made obsolete by the discovery in 1998 of the acceleration of universal expansion, which eventually led to the dark energy and dark matter paradigm of this decade.

The cosmological effects of cold DM are almost opposite to the hot DM effects. Given that cold DM promotes the growth of large scale structures, it is often believed to be composed of weakly interacting massive particles. Conversely hot DM suffers of free-streaming for most of the history of the universe, washing-out the formation of small scales. In other words, the mass of hot DM particles is too small to produce the observed gravitationally bounded objects in the universe. For that reason, the hot DM abundance is constrained by cosmology to less than one percent of the universe contents.

The mixed dark matter scenario recovered relevance when DM was proposed to be a thermal relic of a Bose–Einstein condensate made of very light bosonic particles, as light as neutrinos or even lighter like the axion. This cosmological model predicts that cold DM is made of many condensed particles, while a small fraction of these particles resides in excited energetic states contributing to hot DM.
