= Fuzzy cold dark matter =

Hypothetical form of cold dark matter proposed to solve the cuspy halo problem

Fuzzy cold dark matter is a hypothetical form of cold dark matter proposed to solve the cuspy halo problem. It would consist of extremely light scalar particles with masses on the order of $\approx 10^{-22}$ eV; so a Compton wavelength on the order of 1 light year. Fuzzy cold dark matter halos in dwarf galaxies would manifest wave behavior on astrophysical scales, and the cusps would be avoided through the Heisenberg uncertainty principle. The wave behavior leads to interference patterns, spherical soliton cores in dark matter halo centers, and cylindrical soliton-like cores in dark matter cosmic web filaments.

Fuzzy cold dark matter is a limit of scalar field dark matter without self-interaction. Fuzzy cold dark matter is sometimes called wave DM, or simply fuzzy dark matter (FDM). It is governed by the Schrödinger–Poisson equation.

Fuzzy dark matter models are the simplest class of the ultralight dark matter models; the only free parameter is the particle mass. (In "ultralight dark matter models", the dark matter of a galaxy condenses into a superfluid. This requirement greatly constrains the particle mass; for example, the QCD (Peccei–Quinn) axion is considered too heavy to condense.) A second approach, where FDM is modified to have simple self-interaction, has been suggested with theories such as self-interacting fuzzy dark matter (SIFDM), repulsive DM, scalar field DM, and fluid dark matter. A third approach, called the "DM superfluid model", focuses on the empirical data for a large-scale MOND relation, and then works backwards to determine what types of complicated self-interactions would best produce such a distribution.
