= Cuspy halo problem =

Unsolved problem in physics

The cuspy halo problem (also known as the core-cusp problem) is a discrepancy between the inferred dark matter density profiles of low-mass galaxies and the density profiles predicted by cosmological N-body simulations. Nearly all simulations form dark matter halos which have "cuspy" dark matter distributions, with density increasing steeply at small radii, while the rotation curves of most observed dwarf galaxies suggest that they have flat central dark matter density profiles ("cores").

Several possible solutions to the core-cusp problem have been proposed. Many recent studies have shown that including baryonic feedback (particularly feedback from supernovae and active galactic nuclei) can "flatten out" the core of a galaxy's dark matter profile, since feedback-driven gas outflows produce a time-varying gravitational potential that transfers energy to the orbits of the collisionless dark matter particles. Other works have shown that the core-cusp problem can be solved outside of the most widely accepted Lambda-Cold Dark Matter paradigm (ΛCDM): simulations with warm or self-interacting dark matter also produce dark matter cores in low-mass galaxies. It is also possible that the distribution of dark matter that minimizes the system energy has a flat central dark matter density profile.

== Simulation results ==
According to W.J.G. de Blok "The presence of a cusp in the centers of CDM halos is one of the earliest and strongest results derived from N-body cosmological simulations." Numerical simulations for CDM structure formation predict some structure properties that conflict with astronomical observations.

Simulations focusing on the effects of baryonic feedback from supernovae and active galactic nuclei have found correlations between the frequency of cores in dwarf galaxy halos and bursty star formation. Galaxies that experience high star formation in their central regions for prolonged time scales (2-3 Gyrs) with comparable mass between baryons and dark matter appears to result in core formation. If true this would lessen tension between the ΛCDM model and observations.

Results from the SMUGGLE model support evidence of the role of feedback in core formation, but also highlight the importance of accurate Interstellar Medium (ISM) modeling. The influence of feedback on core formation appears to take place on the scale of 10-100 parsecs, which many current large scale simulations fail to resolve. Without accurate ISM modeling, cores may fail to form despite appropriate existing conditions.

== Observations ==
Dark matter density profiles are not directly observable and are often inferred from the rotation curves of galaxies. The mass density profiles of observed low surface brightness (LSB) and dwarf galaxies are often dominated by cores, and the best-fit power-law slope $\alpha$ in $\rho(r) \propto r^{\alpha}$, is inconsistent with ΛCDM models. Later studies also found that the shapes of inner rotation curves in dwarf galaxies display a large variety; some agree with the steeper curves of simulations, while many others match the core slopes seen in earlier observations. In a study using ALMA data, the inner dark matter density profiles sampled from six nearby spiral dwarf galaxies showed that massive dwarf galaxies tend to be more cuspy compared to lower-mass dwarf galaxies.

More recently, a nearby ultra diffuse galaxy in a dwarf-sized halo, AGC 242019, was observed to have a dark matter rotation curve consistent with the NFW model. The profile was inferred from spatially resolved mapping of gas dynamics, showing a cuspy inner dark matter density curve.

== Potential solutions ==
The conflict between numerical simulations and astronomical observations creates numerical constraints related to the core/cusp problem. Observational constraints on halo concentrations imply the existence of theoretical constraints on cosmological parameters. According to McGaugh, Barker, and de Blok, there might be 3 basic possibilities for interpreting the halo concentration limits stated by them or anyone else:

1. "CDM halos must have cusps, so the stated limits hold and provide new constraints on cosmological parameters."
2. "Something (e.g. feedback, modifications of the nature of dark matter) eliminates cusps and thus the constraints on cosmology."
3. "The picture of halo formation suggested by CDM simulations is wrong."

One approach to solving the cusp-core problem in galactic halos is to consider models that modify the nature of dark matter; theorists have considered warm, fuzzy, self-interacting, and meta-cold dark matter, among other possibilities. One straightforward solution could be that the distribution of dark matter that minimizes the system energy has a flat central dark matter density profile.

== See also ==
- Dwarf galaxy problem (also known as "the missing satellites problem")
- List of unsolved problems in physics
