= 6C 091740+445437 =

Radio galaxy

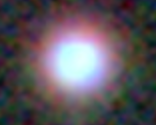
- DESI Legacy DR10 image of 6C 091740+445437

Observation data (J2000 epoch)
- Constellation: Ursa Major
- Right ascension: 09^{h} 20^{m} 58.46^{s}
- Declination: +44° 41' 53.99"
- Redshift: 2.18786
- Heliocentric radial velocity: 246078
- Distance: 12.1 billion ly (3,710 mpc
- Apparent magnitude (V): 18.16

Characteristics
- Type: FSRQ
- Mass: 9.55 trillion M_{☉}
- Size: 165,600 ly (50,760 pc)

Other designations
- B3 0917+449, QSO J0920+4441, INTREF 383

6C 091740+445437 also known as B3 0917+449, is a blazar, flat-spectrum radio quasar, and radio galaxy in the constellation of Ursa Major. The galaxy is at redshift z = 2.19, equal to roughly 12 billion light years (or 3,710 megaparsecs) away and it has a visual magnitude of 18.16. The galaxy was first reported in literature in a 1993 survey of quasi-stellar objects.

== Physical properties ==
6C 091740+445437 is a massive, large galaxy that it is not a part of any galaxy clusters, classifying it as a field galaxy. The galaxy is large with a size of approximately 166,000 light years (50,760 parsecs) across or about twice the size of the Milky Way, based on a SDSS isophotal angular diameter of 5.99 arcsecs and a 3K CMB redshift-corrected distance. The galaxy is one of the most massive galaxies discovered. It has an stellar mass of 10^{12.98}, equivalent to 9.55 trillion M_{☉}, and it is comparable in mass to small, compact galaxy clusters.

The galactic center of 6C 091740+445437 contains an active galactic nucleus (also known as an AGN), specifically classified as a flat-spectrum radio quasar (also referred as a FSRQ). A flat-spectrum radio quasar is a subtype of blazar, and it is generally very luminous. The flat-spectrum radio quasar in the center of the galaxy has an estimated luminosity of 56 trillion L_{☉}. The flat-spectrum radio quasar is powered by a ultramassive black hole (commonly called a UMBH) with a mass of 10^{10.32} or 20.9 billion M_{☉}, making it one of the most massive black holes discovered.

In 2023, in the LOFAR Two-Metre Sky Survey (LoTSS) it was discovered that 6C 091740+445437 was a radio galaxy. The radio structure has an extent of 462,000 light years (141,600 parsecs) across, calculated using an angular diameter of 17.1 arcsecs.

== See also ==
- ESO 146-5, another high-mass galaxy.
- QSO J0529-4351, another extremely luminous quasar.
