= Self-interacting dark matter =

Hypothetical form of dark matter

In astrophysics and particle physics, self-interacting dark matter (SIDM) is an alternative class of dark matter particles that have strong interactions, in contrast to the standard cold dark matter model (CDM). SIDM was postulated in 2000 as a solution to the core-cusp problem. In the simplest models of dark matter self-interactions, a Yukawa-type potential and a force carrier φ mediates between two dark matter particles. On galactic scales, dark matter self-interaction leads to energy and momentum exchange between dark matter particles. Over cosmological time scales this results in isothermal cores in the central region of dark matter haloes.

If the self-interacting dark matter is in hydrostatic equilibrium, its pressure and density follow:

$$\nabla P_\chi/\rho_\chi = \nabla \Phi_\text{tot} = \nabla (\Phi_\chi + \Phi_\text{b}) ,$$

where $\Phi_{\chi}$ and $\Phi_\text{b}$ are the gravitational potential of the dark matter and a baryon respectively. The equation naturally correlates the dark matter distribution to that of the baryonic matter distribution. With this correlation, the self-interacting dark matter can explain phenomena such as the Tully–Fisher relation.

Self-interacting dark matter has also been postulated as an explanation for the DAMA annual modulation signal. Moreover, it is shown that it can serve the seed of supermassive black holes at high redshift. SIDM may have originated in a so-called "Dark Big Bang".

In July 2024 a study proposed SIDM solves the "final-parsec problem", two months later another study proposed the same with fuzzy cold dark matter.

== See also ==
- MACS J0025.4-1222, astronomical observations that constrain dark matter self-interaction
- ESO 146-5, the core of Abell 3827 that was claimed as the first evidence of SIDM
- Strongly interacting massive particle (SIMP), proposed to explain cosmic ray data
- Lambda-CDM model
