= Spherical collapse model =

Dark matter halo formation model

The spherical collapse model describes the evolution of nearly homogeneous matter in the early Universe into collapsed virialized structures - dark matter halos. This model assumes that halos are spherical and dominated by gravity which leads to an analytical solution for several of the halos' properties such as density and radius over time.

The framework for spherical collapse was first developed to describe the infall of matter into clusters of galaxies. At this time, in the early 1970s, astronomical evidence for dark matter was still being collected, and it was believed that the Universe was dominated by ordinary, visible matter. However, it is now thought that dark matter is the dominating species of matter.

== Derivation and key equations ==
The simplest halo formation scenario involves taking a sufficiently overdense spherical patch, which we call a proto-halo (e.g., Desjacques et al. 2018), of the early Universe and tracking its evolution under the effect of its self-gravity. Once the proto-halo has collapsed and virialized, it becomes a halo.

Since the matter outside this sphere is spherically symmetric, we can apply Newton's shell theorem or Birkhoff's theorem (for a more general description), so that external forces average to zero and we can treat the proto-halo as isolated from the rest of the Universe. The proto-halo has a density $\rho$, mass $M$, and radius $r$ (given in physical coordinates) which are related by $\rho=M/(4\pi r^3/3)$.

To model the collapse of the spherical region, we can either use Newton's law or the second Friedmann equation, giving

$$\ddot r = -\frac{G M}{r^2}  ~.$$

The effect of the accelerated expansion of the Universe can be included if desired, but it is a subdominant effect.

The above equation admits the explicit solution

$$r(t)=r_0~Q\left(1-\frac{t}{t_{\text{ff}}};\frac{3}{2},\frac{1}{2}\right) ~,$$

where $r_0=r(0)$ is the maximum radius, assumed to occur at time $t=0$, and $Q(x;\alpha,\beta)$ is the quantile function of the Beta distribution, also known as the inverse function of the regularized incomplete beta function $I_x(\alpha,\beta)$. The time

$$t_{\text{ff}}=\pi\sqrt{\frac{r^3_0}{8GM}}=\sqrt{\frac{3\pi}{32G\rho_0}}~,$$

is the free-fall time, where $r(t_{\text{ff}})=0$.

Long before the derivation of this explicit solution, the spherical collapse equation has been known to admit a parametric solution

$$r(\theta) = A (1 - \cos\theta) ~,
\qquad
t(\theta) =  B(\theta - \sin\theta) ~,$$

in terms of a parameter $\theta$. The origin of time, $t=0$, now occurs at a vanishing radius, and the time increases with increasing $\theta$. The coefficients $A,B$ are given by the energy contents of the sphere (cf. equation 5.89 in Dodelson et al.). Initially the sphere expands at the rate of the Universe ($\theta=0$), but then it slows down, turns around ($\theta=\pi$), and ultimately collapses ($\theta=2 \pi$).

If we split the density into a background $\bar \rho$ and perturbation $\delta$ by $\rho(\theta) = \bar\rho\left[1+\delta(\theta)\right]$, we can solve for the fully nonlinear perturbation

$$1+\delta = \frac{9}{2}\frac{(\theta - \sin\theta)^2}{(1 - \cos\theta)^3}~.$$

Initially $\delta=0$, at the turn-around point $\delta \approx 4.55$, and at collapse $\delta = \infty$.

Alternatively, if one considers linear perturbations, or equivalently small times $\theta\ll 1$, the above equation gives us an expression for linear perturbations

$$\delta_L = \frac{3}{20} \theta^2 ~.$$

We can then extrapolate the linear perturbation into nonlinear regimes (more on the usefulness of this below). At turn-around $\delta_L=1.06$ and at collapse we get the spherical collapse threshold

$$\delta_L \approx 1.69 ~.$$

Although the halo does not physically have an overdensity of 1.69 at collapse, the above collapse threshold is nevertheless useful. It tells us that if we model the initial (linear) density field and extrapolate into the future, wherever $\delta_L \geq 1.69$ can be thought of as a collapsing region that will form a halo.

== See also ==
- Galaxy formation and evolution – Subfield of cosmology
- Press–Schechter formalism – A mathematical model used to predict the number of dark matter halos of a certain mass.
