= ESO 146-5 =

Galaxy in the constellation Indus

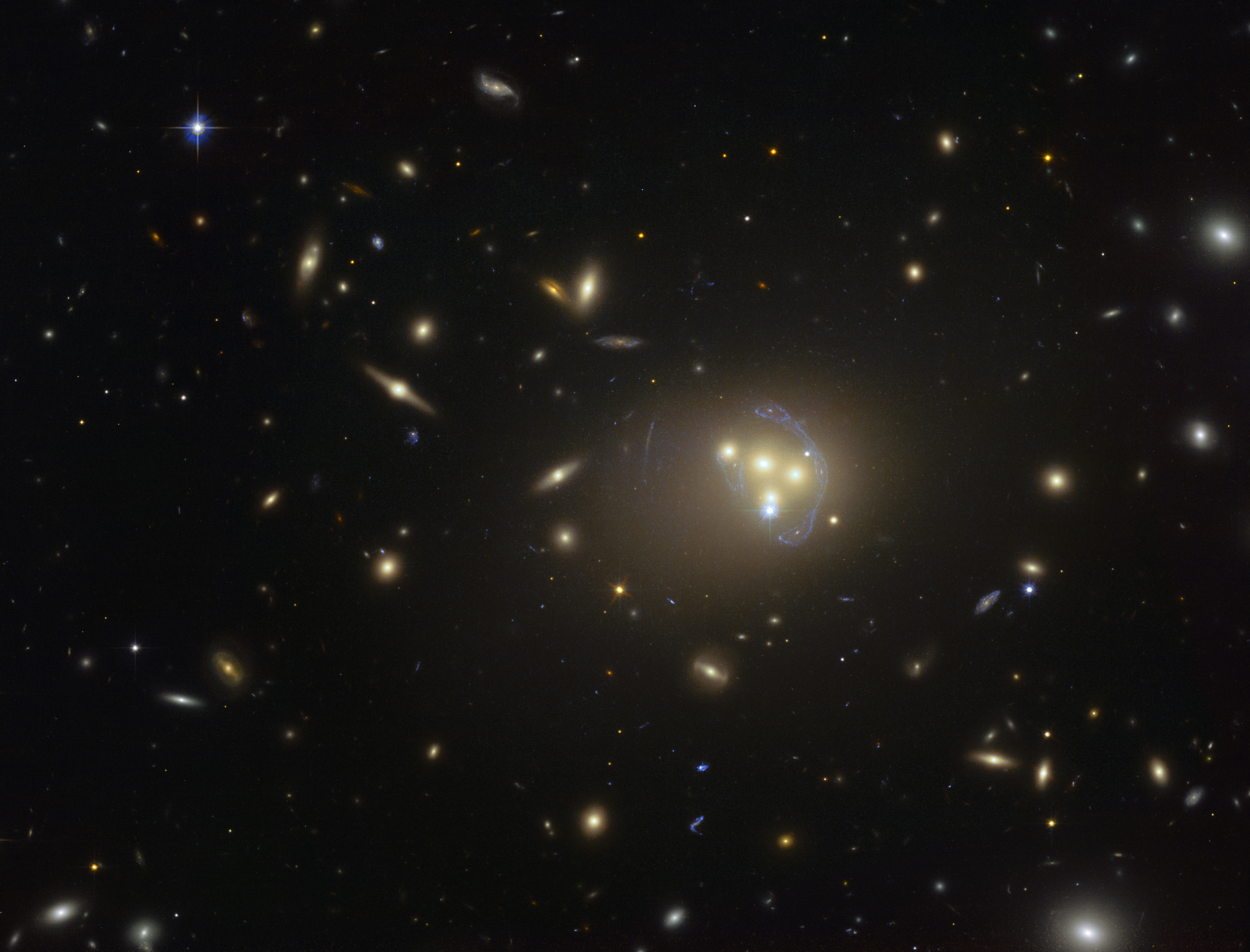
- ESO 146-5 as seen by HST. The extended blue structures surrounding the central galaxies are gravitationally lensed views of a much more distant galaxy behind the cluster.

Observation data (J2000 epoch)
- Constellation: Indus
- Right ascension: 22^{h} 01^{m} 53.37^{s}
- Declination: −59° 56′ 43.469″
- Redshift: 0.099792±0.000160
- Heliocentric radial velocity: 29,917±48 km/s
- Galactocentric velocity: 29,843±48 km/s
- Distance: 1,443 ± 101.1 Mly (442.5 ± 31.0 Mpc)h^{−1}_{0.6774} (Comoving); 391 Mly (119.9 Mpc)h^{−1}_{0.6774} (Light-travel)
- Group or cluster: Abell 3827
- Apparent magnitude (V): 15.75

Characteristics
- Type: 2.0
- Mass: (2.7±0.4)×10^{13} M_{☉}
- Size: 660,560 ly × 363,310 ly (202.53 kpc × 111.39 kpc) (diameter; 27.0 B-mag arcsec^{−2}) (Note: The quoted diameter in this infobox was based on NED's provided scale "Virgo + GA + Shapley" of 2.145 kpc/arcsec multiplied with given angular diameters.)
- Apparent size (V): 0.460′ × 0.331′

Other designations
- APMBGC 146+076+007, ENACS ACO 3827 11, 2MASX J22015330-5956437

ESO 146-5 (ESO 146-IG 005) is the designation given to a giant interacting elliptical galaxy in the center of the Abell 3827 cluster. It is well noted due to its strong gravitational lensing effect, measurements of which show the galaxy to be one of the most massive in the known universe.

== Physical characteristics ==
This interacting galaxy was found 442.5 megaparsecs (1.44 billion light-years) away in the center of Abell 3827. A huge halo of stars surrounds its interacting nuclei. It has immense gravity that holds the cluster together due to its mass. Its unusual shape has led to the conclusion that each one of the nuclei was formed from multiple collisions of smaller galaxies, and now the nuclei are merging to form a single huge elliptical galaxy.

Gravitational lensing calculations appeared to show that there is a large dark matter mass lagging the top left nucleus, possibly explained by it being self-interacting dark matter. However, this finding has since been discounted based on further observations and modelling of the cluster.

== Mass ==
Observations from the Gemini South Telescope has shown that ESO 146-5 has gravitationally lensed two galaxies, a galaxy 2.7 billion light years away, and the other, 5.1 billion light years away. Using Einstein's theory of general relativity, it was measured to be approximately 27±4 trillion solar masses (M_{☉}), making it one of the most massive galaxies in the known universe.

== Gallery ==
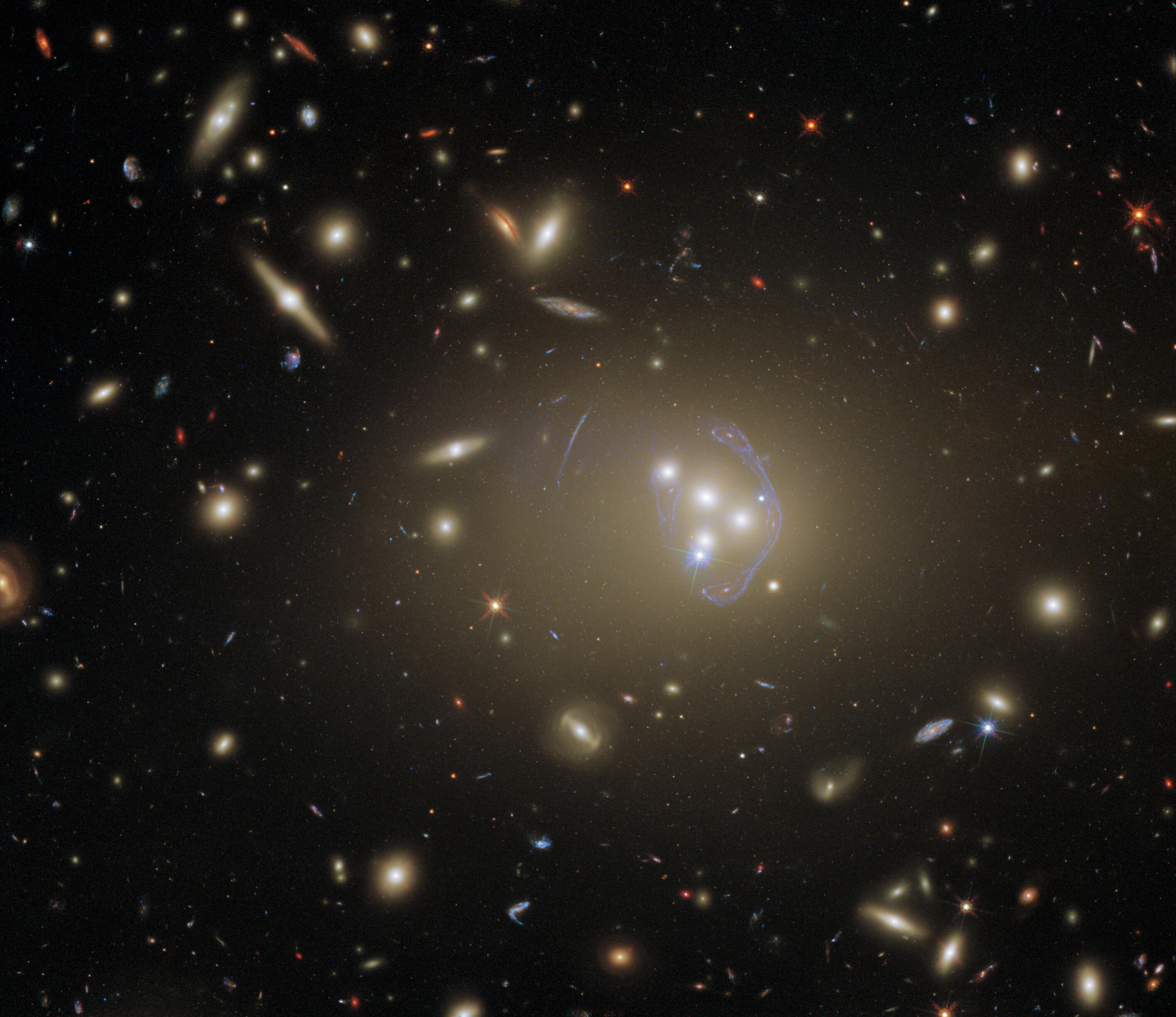
This detailed image features Abell 3827.

== See also ==
- 6C 091740+445437, another high-mass galaxy.
