= NGC 1140 =

Irregular galaxy in Eridanus

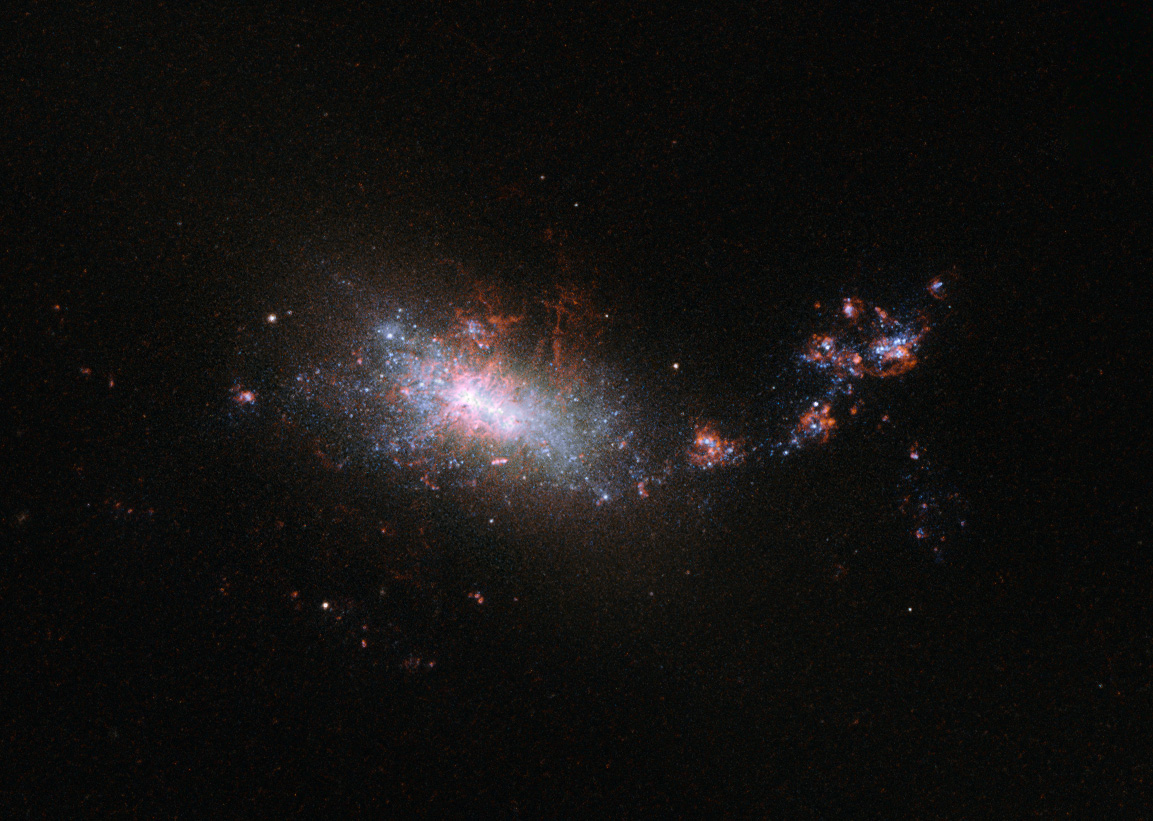
- NGC 1140, imaged by the Hubble Space Telescope

Observation data (J2000 epoch)
- Constellation: Eridanus
- Right ascension: 02^{h} 54^{m} 33.542^{s}
- Declination: −10° 01′ 42.60″
- Redshift: 0.005007
- Heliocentric radial velocity: 1150 km/s
- Distance: 59.47 ± 4.18 Mly (18.233 ± 1.283 Mpc)
- Apparent magnitude (V): 12.25
- Apparent magnitude (B): 12.84
- Absolute magnitude (V): −19.05

Characteristics
- Type: IBm pec
- Apparent size (V): 1.7′ × 0.9′
- Notable features: Wolf–Rayet galaxy

Other designations
- Markarian 1063, VV 482, MCG-02-08-019, PGC 10966

NGC 1140 is an irregular galaxy in the southern constellation of Eridanus. Estimates made using the Tully–Fisher method put the galaxy at about 59 million light years (18 megaparsecs). It was discovered on 22 November 1786 by William Herschel, and was described as "pretty bright, small, round, stellar" by John Louis Emil Dreyer, the compiler of the New General Catalogue.

NGC 1140 is a starburst galaxy, meaning it is forming stars at a very fast rate. In fact, while it is only a tenth as wide as the Milky Way, it is producing stars at a rate of 0.65 M_{☉}/yr, about the same as the Milky Way. The image taken by the Hubble Space Telescope shows bright blue and red regions of star formation, similar to NGC 1569. The starburst is estimated to have begun about 5 million years ago. Its low metallicity (the ratio of hydrogen and helium to other elements) makes NGC 1140 similar to primordial galaxies.

Wolf–Rayet stars, a class of blue, massive, and luminous stars, are present in this galaxy; in fact, NGC 1140 has so many of them that their spectra also appear in the galaxy's spectrum. These types of galaxies are known Wolf–Rayet galaxies, and are fairly rare because Wolf–Rayet stars are a short stage in the lives of very massive stars.

== Gallery ==
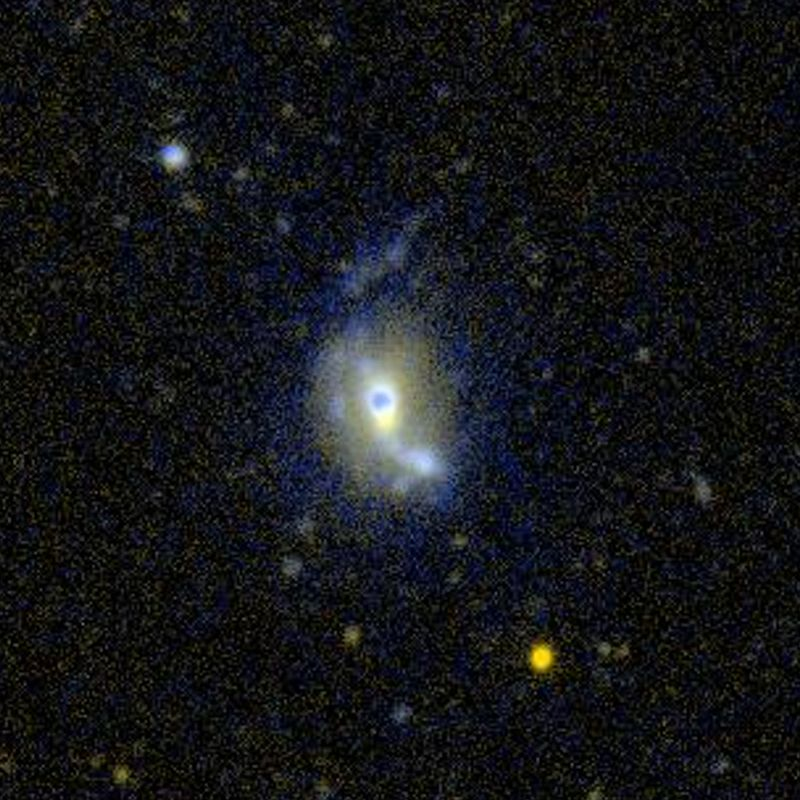
NGC 1140 by GALEX

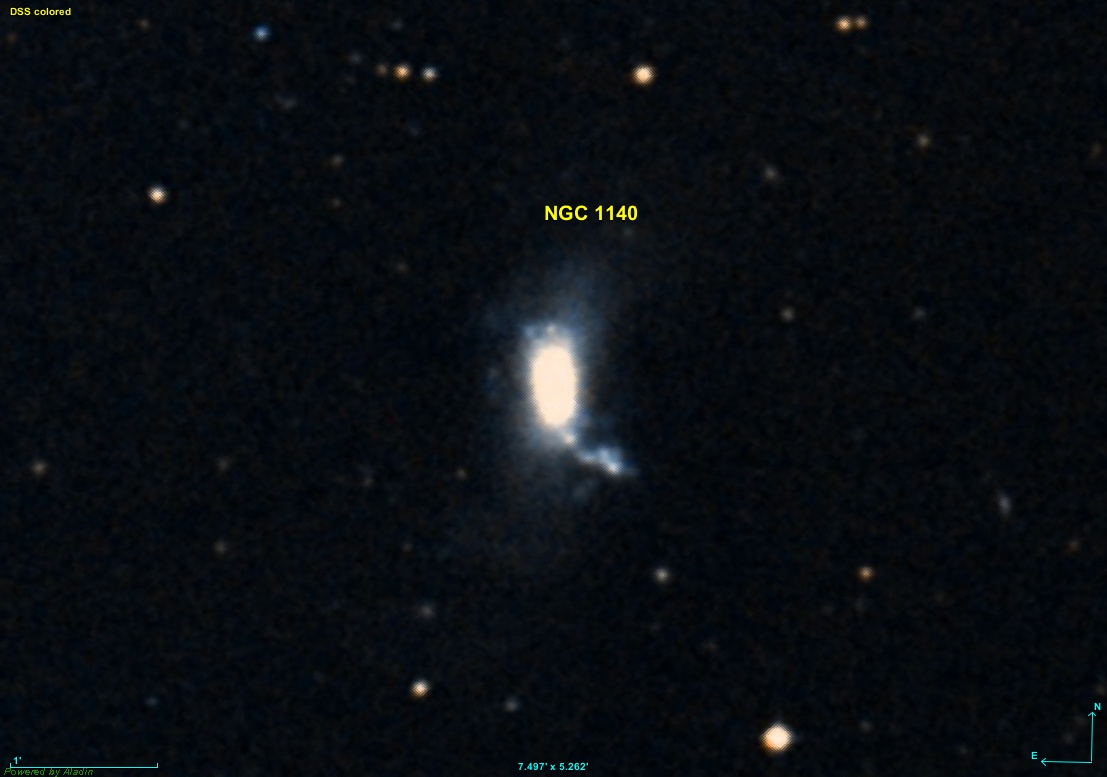
DSS image of NGC 1140

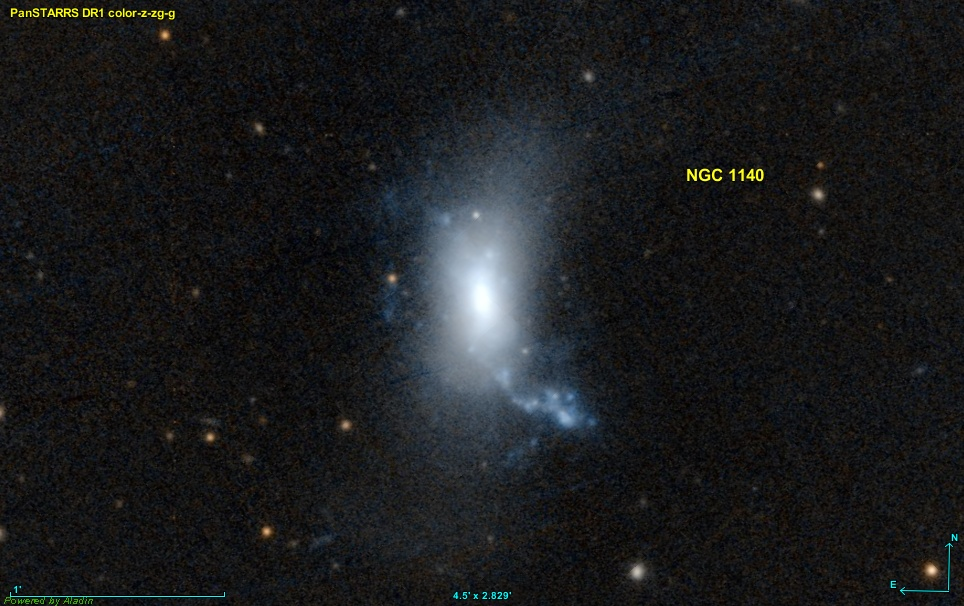
Pan-STARRS image of NGC 1140
