= Hot dark matter =

Theoretical form of dark matter particles which travel near the speed of light

Hot dark matter (HDM) is a theoretical form of dark matter which consists of particles that travel with ultrarelativistic velocities.

== Description ==
Dark matter is a form of matter that neither emits nor absorbs light. Within physics, this behavior is characterized by dark matter not interacting with electromagnetic radiation, hence making it dark and rendering it undetectable via conventional instruments in physics.

Data from galaxy rotation curves indicate that approximately 80% of the mass of a galaxy cannot be seen, forcing researchers to innovate ways that indirectly detect it through dark matter's effects on gravitational fluctuations.

As we shall see below, it is useful to differentiate dark matter into "hot" (HDM) and "cold" (CDM) types–some even suggesting a middle-ground of "warm" dark matter (WDM). The terminology refers to the mass of the dark matter particles (which dictates the speed at which they travel): HDM travels faster than CDM because the HDM particles are theorized to be of lower mass.

== Role in galaxy formation ==
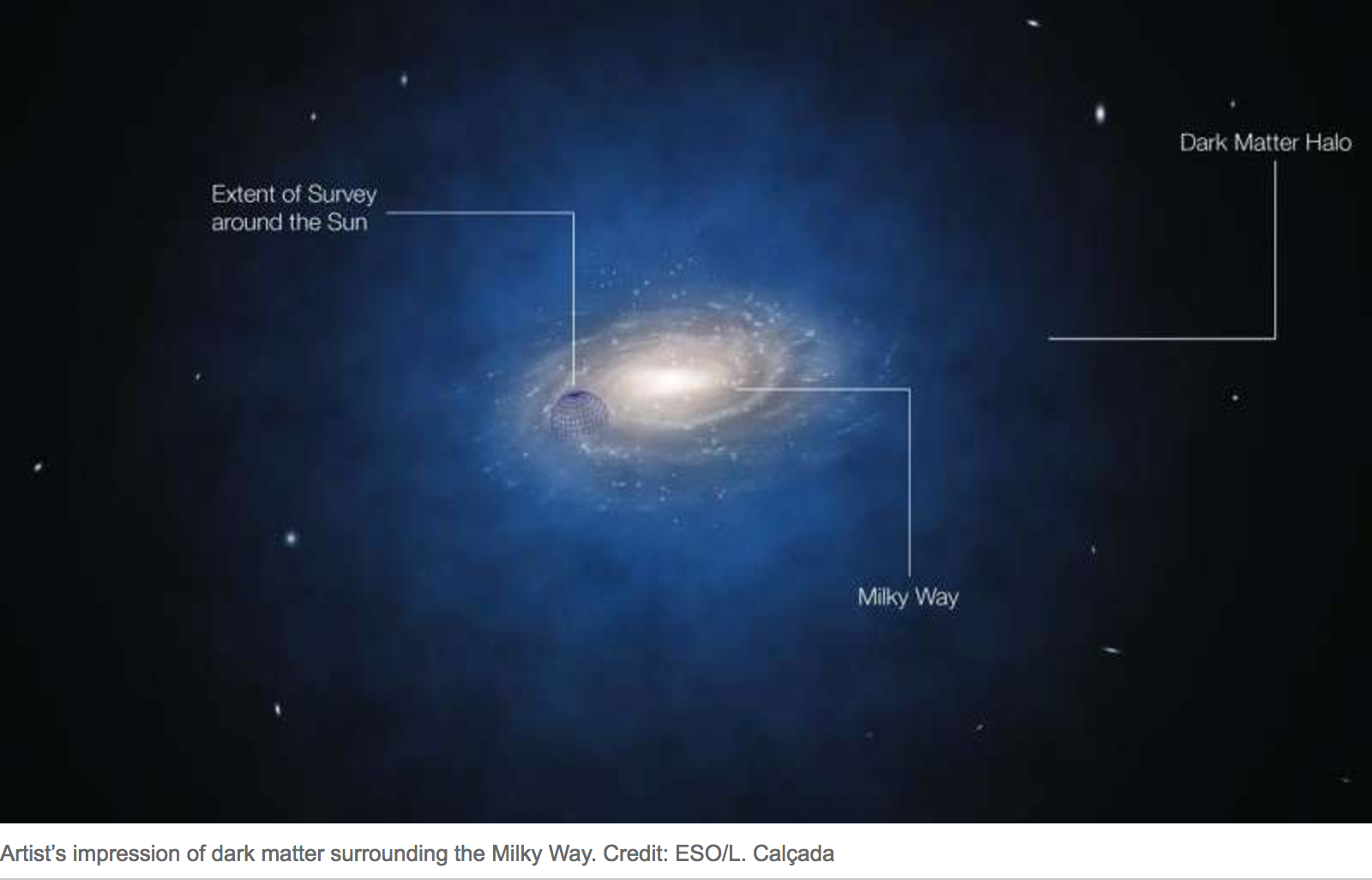
Artist's impression of dark matter surrounding the Milky Way. Credit: ESO/L. Calçada

In terms of its application, the distribution of hot dark matter could also help explain how clusters and superclusters of galaxies formed after the Big Bang. Theorists claim that there exist two classes of dark matter:

1) those that "congregate around individual members of a cluster of visible galaxies" and

2) those that encompass "the clusters as a whole." Because cold dark matter possesses a lower velocity, it could be the source of "smaller, galaxy-sized lumps," as shown in the image.

Hot dark matter, then, should correspond to the formation of larger mass aggregates that surround whole galaxy clusters. However, data from the cosmic microwave background radiation, as measured by the COBE satellite, is highly uniform, and such high-velocity hot dark matter particles cannot form clumps as small as galaxies beginning from such a smooth initial state, highlighting a discrepancy in what dark matter theory and the actual data are saying. Theoretically, in order to explain relatively small-scale structures in the observable Universe, it is necessary to invoke cold dark matter or WDM. In other words, hot dark matter being the sole substance in explaining cosmic galaxy formation is no longer viable, placing hot dark matter under the larger umbrella of mixed dark matter (MDM) theory.

== Neutrinos ==
An example of a hot dark matter particle is the neutrino. Neutrinos have very small masses, and do not take part in two of the four fundamental forces, the electromagnetic interaction and the strong interaction. They interact by the weak interaction, and most probably gravity, but due to the feeble strength of these forces, they are difficult to detect. A number of projects, such as the Super-Kamiokande neutrino observatory, in Gifu, Japan are currently studying these neutrinos.

== See also ==
- Lambda-CDM model – Mathematical model of the Big Bang
- Modified Newtonian dynamics – Hypothesis proposing a modification of Newton's laws
- Weakly interacting slender particle (WISP)
