= Warm dark matter =

Hypothesized form of dark matter

Warm dark matter (WDM) is a hypothesized form of dark matter that has properties intermediate between those of hot dark matter and cold dark matter, causing structure formation to occur bottom-up from above their free-streaming scale, and top-down below their free streaming scale. The most common WDM candidates are sterile neutrinos and gravitinos. The WIMPs (weakly interacting massive particles), when produced non-thermally, could be candidates for warm dark matter. In general, however, the thermally produced WIMPs are cold dark matter candidates.

== Candidates ==
Sterile neutrinos with masses of a few keV are possible candidates for WDM. At temperatures below the electroweak scale their only interactions with standard model particles are weak interactions due to their mixing with ordinary neutrinos. Due to the smallness of the mixing angle they are not overproduced because they freeze out before reaching thermal equilibrium. Their properties are consistent with astrophysical bounds coming from structure formation and the Pauli principle if their mass is larger than 1-8 keV.

Another possible WDM candidate particle comes from introducing two new, zero charge, zero lepton number fermions to the Standard Model of Particle Physics: "keV-mass inert fermions" (keVins) and "GeV-mass inert fermions" (GeVins). keVins are overproduced if they reach thermal equilibrium in the early universe, but in some scenarios the entropy production from the decays of unstable heavier particles may suppress their abundance to the correct value. These particles are considered "inert" because they only have suppressed interactions with the Z boson.

== Potential signatures ==
In February 2014, different analyses have extracted from the spectrum of X-ray emissions observed by XMM-Newton, a monochromatic signal around 3.5 keV. This signal is coming from different galaxy clusters (like Perseus and Centaurus) and several scenarios of warm dark matter can justify such a line. This signal could be explained by 3.5 keV WDM annihilating into 2 photons, or 7 keV WDM decaying into a photon and a neutrino.

In November 2019, analysis of the interaction of various galactic halo matter on densities and distribution of stellar streams, coming off the satellites of the Milky Way, they were able to constrain minimums of mass for density perturbations by warm dark matter in the GD-1 and Pal 5 streams. This lower limit on the mass of warm dark matter thermal relics mWDM > 4.6 keV; or adding dwarf satellite counts mWDM > 6.3 keV.

== See also ==
- Dark matter – Hypothetical invisible cosmic material
  - Hot dark matter (HDM) – Theoretical form of dark matter particles which travel near the speed of light
  - Cold dark matter (CDM) – Hypothetical type of dark matter in physics
- Lambda-CDM model – Mathematical model of the Big Bang
