= Van Noort =

Van Noort is a Dutch toponymic surname meaning "from (the) north". Among variant forms are Noort, Van de Noort, and Van Noordt. Before 1811 the spellings "Noordt" and "Noort" were interchangeable. People with this name include:

- Aat van Noort (1908–1998), Dutch middle-distance runner
- Adam van Noort (1561/62–1641), Flemish painter and draughtsman, son of Lambert
- Anthoni van Noordt (c.1619–1675), Dutch composer and organist, nephew of Sybrandt
- Ginie Van De Noort (born 1979), French journalist and television presenter
- Jan van Noordt (1623–1681), Dutch landscape, portrait and allegory painter
- Joël van Noort (born 1980s), Dutch Rubik's Cube speedsolver
- Lambert van Noort (1520–1571), Dutch painter and architect active in Antwerp, father of Adam
- Olivier van Noort (1558–1627), Dutch merchant captain and the first Dutchman to circumnavigate the world
- Peter van der Noort (born 1974), Dutch rower
- Pieter van Noort (1622–1672), Dutch still life painter
- Roald van Noort (born 1960), Dutch water polo player
- Robert Van de Noort, Dutch historian and archaeologist
- Sybrandus van Noordt (1659–1705), Dutch composer and keyboardist

== See also ==
- Noort, surname
- Van Oort
