= Van Apshoven family =

Van Apshoven or van Apshoven is a Dutch language surname. It may refer to:

- Ferdinand van Apshoven the Elder, (1576–1654/5), a Flemish painter
- Ferdinand van Apshoven the Younger (1630–1694), Flemish painter
- Thomas van Apshoven (1622– 1664/7), Flemish painter
