= OPT =

OPT or Opt may refer for:

== Computing ==
- /opt, a directory in the Filesystem Hierarchy Standard
- Option key, a modifier key on Apple keyboards
- OPT, the theoretically optimal page replacement algorithm, a page replacement algorithm for swapping out pages from memory

== Other uses ==
- Occupied Palestinian Territories, an alternative name for the State of Palestine
- Ocean Power Technologies, a US owned renewable energy company
- Office des postes et télécommunications, especially in French Polynesia (Office des postes et télécommunications de Polynésie française) and in New Caledonia
- Operation Prime Time, a consortium of TV Stations to provide alternative prime time programming
- Optical projection tomography, a form of tomographic tissue imaging used in biomedical research
- Optional Practical Training, a period during which university students with an F-1 are permitted by the United States Citizenship and Immigration Services (USCIS) to work for one year on a student visa
- Optimized Production Technology, a production planning system created by Eliyahu M. Goldratt
- Outdoor Payment Terminal, a name sometimes used for the self-service user interface hardware at fuel stations
- Oral pressure therapy, a treatment for obstructive sleep apnea
- Overseas Passenger Terminal, Sydney
- Obshchestvennoye Rossiyskoye Televideniye (Russian: Общественное Российское Телевидение, ОРТ in Cyrillic script), the former name of Channel One Russia, a public broadcaster in Russia
- Oxford Placement Test
- Onboard Performance Tool, aviation device for landing calculations based on weather and runway conditions

== See also ==
- Opt-out, to avoid receiving unsolicited product or service information
- Opting out, a political expression in Canada, describing the intention of a province to remove itself from a program administered by the federal government
- Opt in email, the option to receive bulk e-mail
- ORT (disambiguation), an acronym in Russian and Greek which appears like OPT
