= Ort =

Ort or ORT may refer to:

== Broadcasting ==
- Channel One Russia (formerly Obshchestvennoye Rossiskoye Televideniye)
- ORT (TV channel), a Greek radio and television station (Ολυμπιακή Ραδιοφωνία Τηλεόραση)

== Organisations ==
- Order of Railroad Telegraphers, an American labor union (founded 1886)
- Organización Revolucionaria de los Trabajadores, a Spanish political party (1969–1980)
- Oxford Round Table, a series of interdisciplinary conferences held in England (founded 1989)
- World ORT, a Jewish youth training charity (founded 1880)
- Renewed Order of the Temple, Ordre rénové du Temple, French neo-Templar order

== Places ==
=== Austria ===
- Ort im Innkreis, a municipality in Ried im Innkreis
- Schloss Ort, a castle near the Traunsee lake

=== United States ===
- Izzy Ort's Bar & Grille, a closed live music venue in Boston, Massachusetts
- Northway Airport, Alaska (IATA:ORT)
- Ohio River Trail, the Mid-Atlantic

=== Elsewhere ===
- Ooty Radio Telescope, a radio telescope in India
- Palmer Ort, on the German island of Rügen

== Science and technology ==
=== Medicine ===
- Opioid replacement therapy
- Oral rehydration therapy, for diarrhea-related dehydration
- Ornithobacterium rhinotracheale, a bacterium that causes poultry disease

=== Technologies ===
- Ongoing reliability test, a test process in manufacturing
- Open road tolling, boothless toll collecting
- Operational readiness test

== Other uses ==
- Ort Wells (foaled 1901), an American racehorse
- Ocean Racing Technology, a motor racing team (2002–2012)

== People with the surname Ort ==
- Ort (surname)

== See also ==
- Oort (disambiguation)
- Orth (disambiguation)
