= Orth =

Orth can refer to:

== Places ==
- Orth, Minnesota, an unincorporated community in Nore Township, Minnesota, United States
- Orth an der Donau, a town in Gänserndorf, Lower Austria, Austria
- Orth House, a historic house in Winnetka, Illinois, United States
- Orth C. Galloway House, a historic house in Clarendon, Arkansas, United States
- Schloss Orth, a castle on Traunsee lake, Austria

== People ==
- Al Orth (1872–1948), American baseball player
- August Orth (1828–1901), German architect
- Bertram Orth (1848–1931), German-Canadian prelate of the Catholic Church
- Brodie Orth, American rugby union player
- Christian Henry Orth (1773–1816), American politician
- David Orth (b. 1965), Canadian actor
- Eduard Orth (1902–1968), German politician
- Elisa Orth (born c. 1984), Brazilian researcher
- Florian Orth (b. 1989), German athlete
- Frank Orth (1880–1962), American actor
- Franklin Orth (1907–1970), American executive of the National Rifle Association and President of the US Olympic Committee
- Gérard Orth (b. 1936), French virologist
- Godlove Stein Orth (1817–1882), American congressman
- György Orth (1901–1962), Hungarian footballer
- Haruka Orth (b. 1982), Hungarian-American actress
- Harold (Henry) William Orth (1866–1946), American architect
- Henry Orth (American football) (1897–1980), American football player
- Heide Orth (b. 1942), German tennis player
- Haruka Orth (b. 1982), Hungarian-American actress
- Jaqueline Orth (b. 1993), German sport shooter
- Joaquin Orth (b. 1955), Mexican equestrian
- John Orth, American vocalist of Holopaw
- John V. Orth, American professor
- Johann Orth, assumed name of Archduke Johann Salvator of Austria after renouncing royal titles
- Johannes Orth (1847–1923), German pathologist
- Josef Orth (1914–?), Czech football player
- Karin Orth (b. 1963), German historian
- Kim Orth, American biochemist
- Lizette Emma Orth (1858–1914), American pianist and composer
- Maggie Orth (b. 1964), American artist and technologist
- Maren Orth (b. 1990), German runner
- Marisa Orth (b. 1963), Brazilian actress
- Maureen Orth (b. 1943), American journalist
- Myra Orth (1934–2002), American art historian
- Louise Orth, stage name of Luise Jaide (1842–1914), German opera singer
- Oswald Orth (1832–1920), English professor
- Viktor Orth (1853–1919), outsider artist
- Zak Orth (b. 1970), American actor

Given name:

- Orth Collins (1880–1949), American Baseball player

== Other ==
- Arvas, formerly known as Örth, a Norwegian black metal band
- 4533 Orth (1986 EL), a main-belt asteroid
- Orthrus, two-headed dog in Greek mythology
- Orthography
- Orth is a fictional language in the novel Anathem by Neal Stephenson
- Orth is the name of the main human settlement in Made in Abyss.

== See also ==
- Ort (disambiguation)
- North (disambiguation)
