= Oord (surname) =

Oord or van den Oord or van der Oord is a surname, and may refer to:

- Ab Oord (1885–1961), Dutch weightlifter
- Edwin van den Oord (born 1963), Dutch psychiatric geneticist
- Thomas Jay Oord (born 1965), American philosopher
- Willem van der Oord (1919–1985), Dutch hydraulic engineer

== See also ==
- Van Oord, Dutch dredging company
- Ord (surname)
- Orde (surname)
- Oort (surname)
