= Villa Albani =

Villa built 1747 to 1767 in Rome, Italy

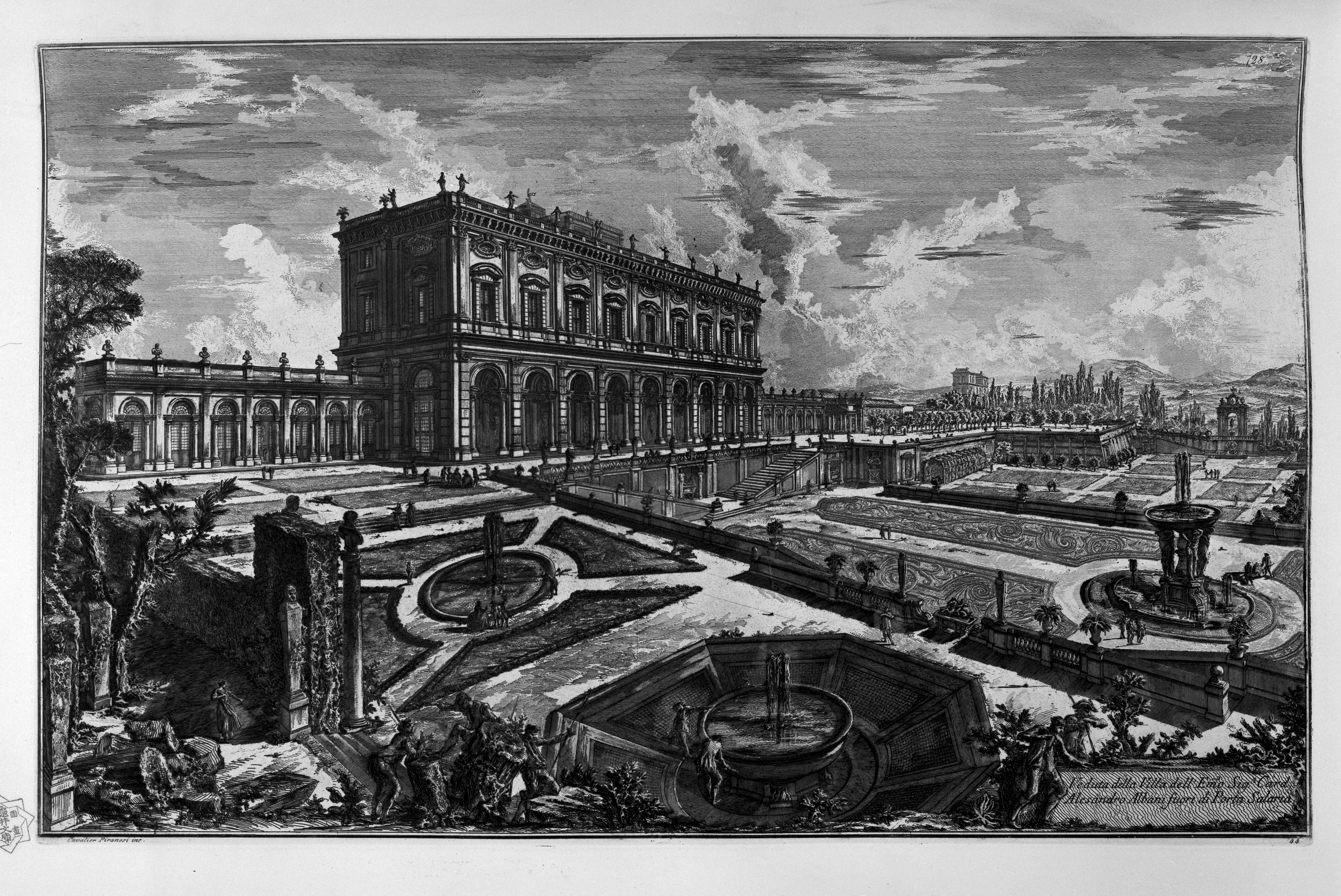
- Drawing by Giovanni Battista Piranesi
- Click on the map for a fullscreen view

General information
- Location: Rome
- Coordinates: 41°54′57.2″N 12°30′00.9″E

The Villa Albani (later Villa Albani-Torlonia) is a villa in Rome, built on the Via Salaria for Cardinal Alessandro Albani. It was built between 1747 and 1767 by the architect Carlo Marchionni in a project heavily influenced by others – such as Giovanni Battista Nolli, Giovanni Battista Piranesi and Johann Joachim Winckelmann – to house Albani's collection of antiquities, curated by Winckelmann. The villa has been conserved intact into the 21st century by the Torlonia Family, who bought it in 1866. In 1870, the treaty following the Capture of Rome from the Papal States was signed here.

== History ==
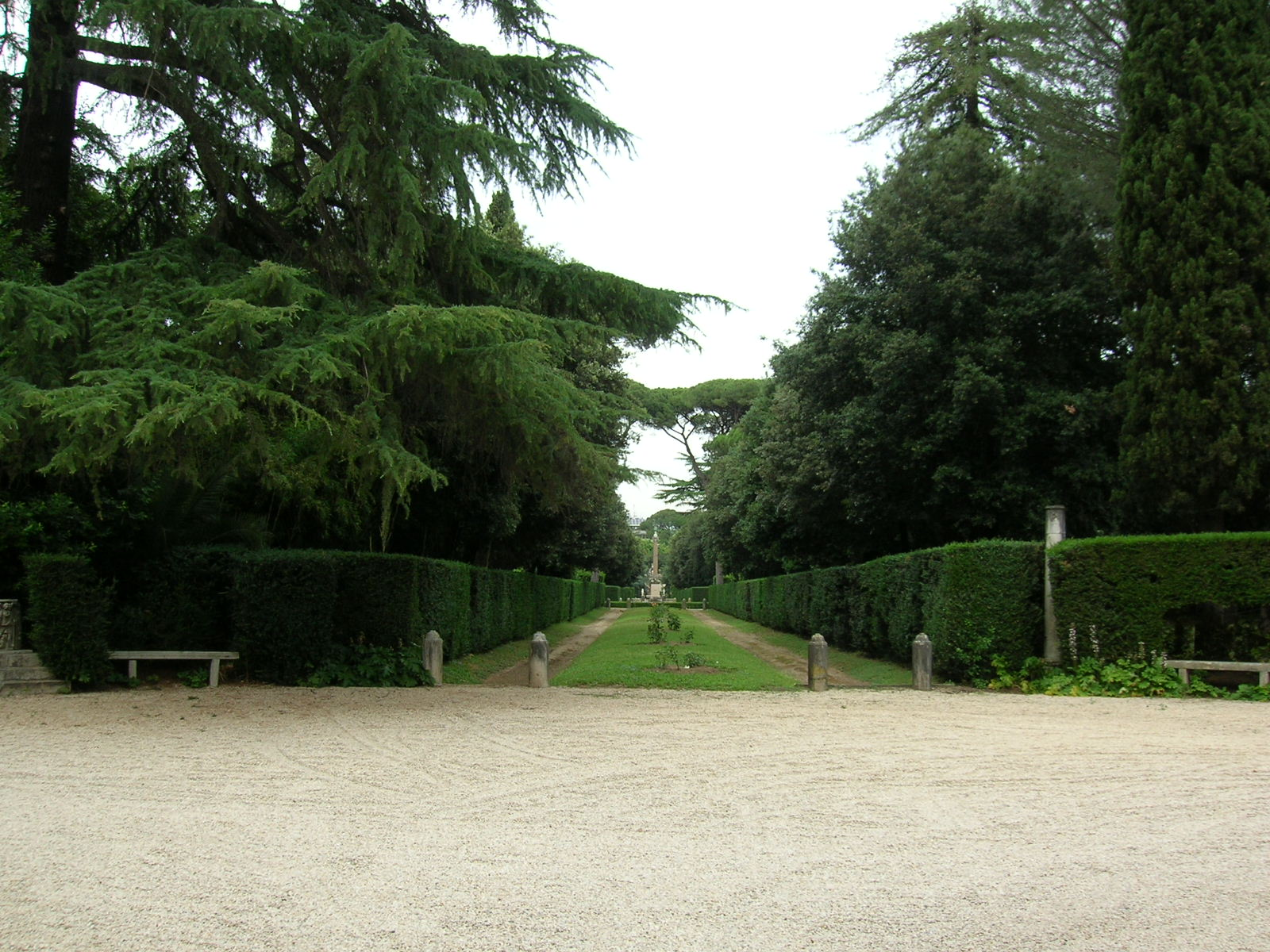
Entrance to the Villa Albani from via Salaria, 92

Planned in 1743, the building of the villa began in 1747 according to Giuseppe Vasi and was celebrated as complete in 1763. Its purpose was to house Cardinal Albani's evolving and renewed collections of antiquities and ancient Roman sculpture, which soon filled the casino that faced the Villa down a series of formal parterres.

The villa with its collection, fountains, statues, stairways and frescoes, and Italian-style garden, the hemicycle of the Kaffeehaus, constitutes a sublime testimony of that particular antiquarian taste which came to the fore in mid-18th-century, that for which Rome had become a key destination on the Grand Tour.

While the Cardinal was the real director of works, for the layout of the works Albani's lifelong friend Carlo Marchionni was the architect in charge, at the Villa and perhaps also for the two temples in the park, an Ionic temple of Diana and a sham ruin. It is hypothesized that Marchionni took advice from Johann Joachim Winckelmann, who at that time, having been hired as librarian by the Cardinal (1759), was creating a catalogue of the collections of antiquities of his patron, paving the way for the reappraisal of Greek art. Winckelmann was a notable force behind the enlargement of the collection, and as he would write in a letter dated August 1766, in the construction process, Albani always adopted Descartes’s maxim not to leave any space empty. And so, in the Sala di Antinoo, the famous relief of Villa Adriana embellished the fireplace, and this room also hosts the famous fresco of Parnassus (1761), created by Anton Raphael Mengs for the vault of the Galleria, which would go on to become the pictorial manifesto of the nascent neoclassical style. Winckelmann was supported by Albani from the time when the Seven Years' War stranded him in Rome without his pension, and whose own connoisseur ship was sharpened by the connection. The nephew of Pope Clement XI, respectful patron and skilled diplomat, Cardinal Alessandro Albani (1692-1779) was in fact one of the greatest collectors of ancient sculptures in 18th-century Rome, and a promoter of that Neo-classical taste that forms the basis of modern archaeological studies.

The Villa, lying just outside the city walls, along the Via Salaria, was built between 1747 and 1763, designed by the architect Carlo Marchionni, when the extensive green area, previously owned by Accoramboni, Ercolani and Orsi, was purchased by Cardinal Albani. A building of representation more than a residence, as suggested by the high-ceilinged rooms, the care of the interiors, the elegant interior façade covering two floors with the majestic terraced loggia, looking onto the Italian-style garden, the Villa was most of all a cultural powerhouse, hosting pleasant moments for the circle of antiquarian friends that the learned churchman had gathered around him. This was the stage of erudite discussions, concerts, dances and masked comedies, and guests would be astonished by the wealth of the furnishings, made up of polychrome marbles, stuccoes, tapestry, paintings, and above all, an exceptional collection of original Greek and Roman sculptures: a passion for the ancient world that Albani had nurtured since his youth, sponsoring vast excavation projects and making purchases both in Rome and in the surrounding areas.

Cardinal Alessandro Albani had another villa and park at Porto d'Anzio, that was finished in February 1732, but was habitable for a few weeks only in spring because of malaria. The Villa remained largely intact even after the death of the Cardinal: the works removed during the Napoleonic period (1797-1815) to decorate the Musée Napoléon in Paris were in fact partly returned after 1815 to their legitimate owner, Prince Carlo Albani while the residence remained property of the Albani family up until the first half of the 19th century, when from the last heir it was passed on to the Albani-Castelbarco family, from whom the Torlonia Family soon after purchased it.

An exceptional building, developed with eclectic taste in a swift succession of rooms decorated with masterpieces like the Apollo Sauroctono and the Parnassus fresco (1761) by Mengs (1728-1779) considered to be the manifesto of the neoclassical style. The world-wide famous bas-relief of the Antinoo from Villa Adriana, depicting the young lover of Emperor Adriano along with the collections showcasing works by Perugino, Vanvitelli, Baciccio among the others.

The Latin inscription in bronze lettering on the façade: “Alexander Albani vir eminentissimus instruxit et ornavit / Alexander Torlonia vir princeps in melius restituit” ("The most eminent Alessandro Albani designed and decorated [this building] / Prince Alessandro Torlonia restored it to better appearance"), tells the story of the house.

The Villa has been saved from the destruction of the Umbertine urbanisation, which soon afterwards would wipe out most of the historical villas of the city, thus dispersing the ancient heritage that for three centuries had made Rome the heart of European artistic life.

== Collection ==
Statues, busts, bas-reliefs, vases, capitals and columns, all carefully selected, decorated the refined interiors, the gardens, the fountains and the various buildings of the villa, which stands as a vast architectural complex of locales and structures (like the Temple of Diana, the Temple of the Caryatids, the coffee-house, the ruined tempietto, the billiards area, etc.), which dialogue with one another with the intention of creating an educational and emotional itinerary, studied down to the last detail, aiming to compete with the villas of Imperial Rome, and leaving its visitors enchanted.

- Nicolò Alunno, Madonna with Child enthroned and Sts. John the Baptist, Caterina d'Alessandria, Sebastian, Anthony, Benedict, Peter, Paul and Augustine, tempera on wood, 200 x 251 cm.
- Pietro Perugino, "Polittico Albani Torlonia" with nativity of Christ with Sts. Michael, John the Baptist, Jerome and George, 1491, tempera on wood, 174 x 88 cm.
- Marco d'Oggiono, Madonna with Child.
- Taddeo Zuccari, Christ in pietà mourned by angels, oil on wood, 252 x 194 cm.
- Francesco del Cairo, St. Sebastian cared for by the widow Irene, oil on canvas.
- Lambert van Noort, La Carità, oil on canvas.
- Ancient bust of a hunchback thought to depict Aesop
