= Orde =

Orde may refer to:

== People ==
=== Given name ===
- Orde Ballantyne (born 1962), a Vincentian athlete at the 1988 Olympics
- Orde M. Coombs (1939–1984), African-American writer and editor
- Orde Kittrie, American professor of law
- Orde Wingate (1903–1944), unconventional British Army officer

=== Surname ===
- Orde (surname)

== Other ==
- Orda (organization), sociopolitical structure on the steppes
