= Oort (surname) =

Oort is a Dutch toponymic surname most commonly referring to the astronomer Jan Oort. Oort was one spelling of a Middle Dutch word for 'edge' or 'end', as in "the edge of town". Variant forms are Oord, Oordt and Ort, as well as Van Oort, Van den Oord etc. ('from the edge [of town]').

== Notable people with this surname ==
=== Oort ===
- Abraham H. Oort (born 1934), Dutch-American climatologist, son of Jan Oort
- Frans Oort (born 1935), Dutch mathematician
  - André–Oort conjecture, a number theory conjecture by Yves André and Frans Oort
- Henricus Oort (1836–1927), Dutch theologist and philologist
- Jan Oort (1900–1992), Dutch astronomer. Named after him:
  - Oort cloud, a cloud of solid objects surrounding the Solar System
  - Oort constants, characterizing the rotational properties of the Milky Way
  - Oort (crater), a crater on Pluto
  - Oort limit, theoretical edge of the Oort cloud
  - 1691 Oort (1956 RB), a main-belt asteroid

=== Van Oort ===
- Adam van Oort (1561/62–1641), Flemish painter
- Bart van Oort (born 1959), Dutch classical pianist
- Eduard Daniel van Oort (1876–1933), Dutch ornithologist
- Jan van Oort (1921–2006), Dutch writer, working under the pseudonym of Jean Dulieu
- Johannes (Hans) van Oort (born 1949), Dutch patristic and gnostic scholar
- Hendrik van Oort (1775–1847), Dutch painter
- Pieter van Oort (1804–1834), Dutch painter and illustrator, son of Hendrik
  - Named after him: Vanoort's crow, an Indonesian butterfly

== See also ==
- Ort (surname)
- Ortt (surname)
- Oord (surname)
- Oordt, surname
- Noort, Dutch surname (including "Van Noort")
