= Oordt =

Oordt is a surname, and may refer to:

- Adri Bleuland van Oordt (1862–1944), Dutch artist and draftswoman
- Gabriël van Oordt (1757–1836), Dutch theologian
- Darwin Oordt (born 1944), American newspaper publisher and horse breeder
- Johan Frederik van Oordt (1794–1852), Dutch theologian
- Johanna Bleuland van Oordt (1865–1948), Dutch painter
- María Pia van Oordt (born 2000), Peruvian sailor
- Schuylar Oordt (born 1987), American football player

== See also ==
- Oord (surname)
- Oort (surname)
