= Portrait of a Lady (de Crayer) =

Painting by Gaspar de Crayer

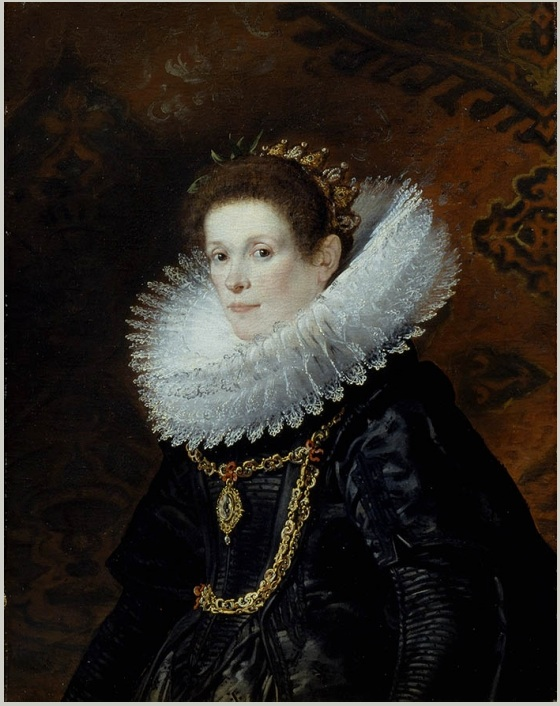
- Artist: Gaspar de Crayer
- Year: 1620s
- Medium: Oil on canvas
- Dimensions: 83 cm × 65 cm (32.7 in × 25.6 in)
- Location: Academy of Fine Arts Vienna; Vienna

Portrait of a Lady is an oil on canvas painting by Flemish painter Gaspar de Crayer. The painting is kept in the Academy of Fine Arts in Vienna.

The identity of the eminent lady portrayed in this painting is not known. The woman in the painting wears a prominent white ruff, which contrast with her black clothes, adorned with a golden chain and a conspicuous pendant. The white ruff is contour to the lady's fair skin. De Crayer probably completed this oeuvre in the 1620s.
