= Gaspar de Crayer =

Flemish painter (1584–1669)

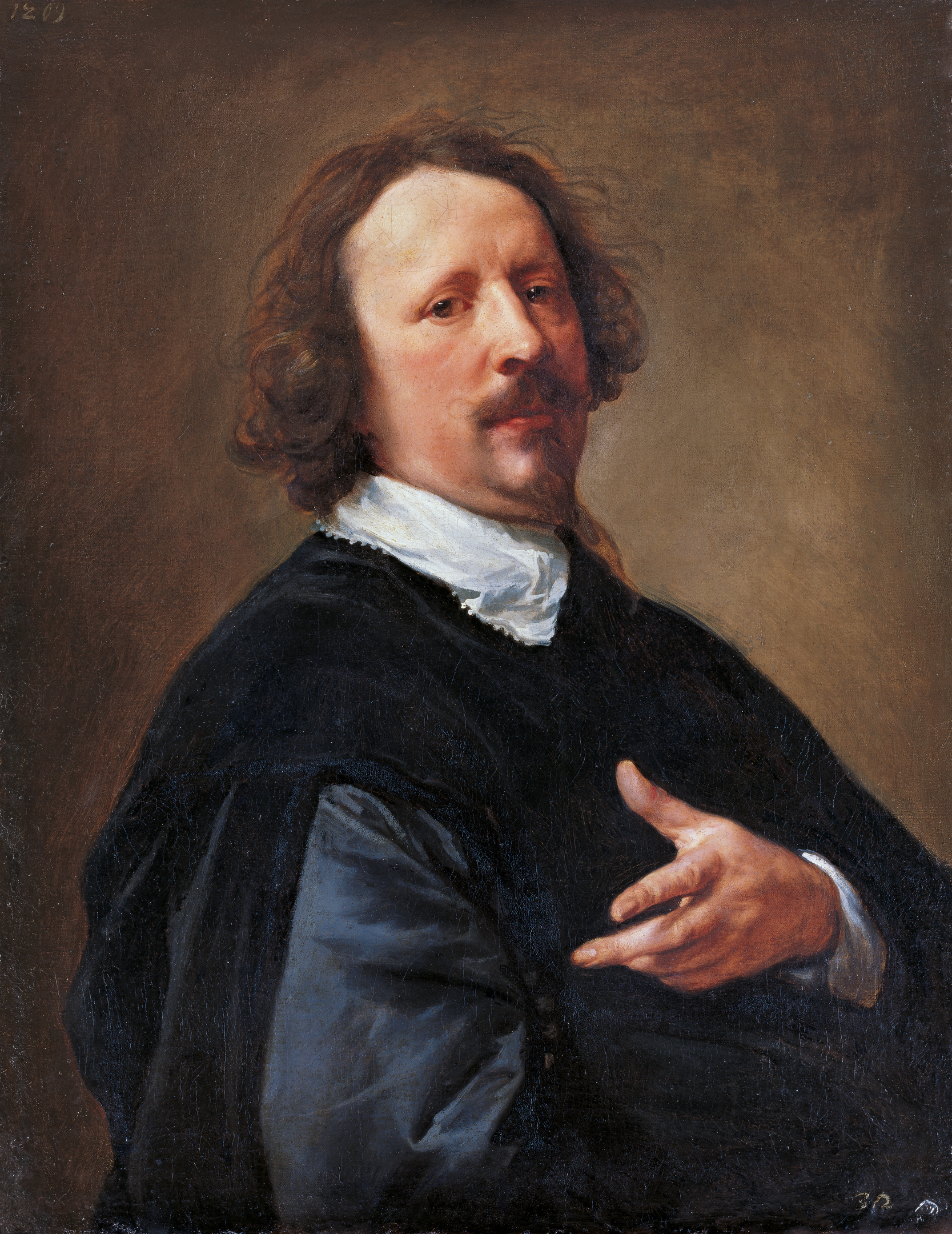
Gaspar de Crayer by van Dyck

Gaspar de Crayer or Jasper de Crayer (18 November 1584 – 27 January 1669) was a Flemish painter known for his many Counter-Reformation altarpieces and portraits. He was a court painter to the governors of the Southern Netherlands and worked in the principal cities of Flanders where he helped spread the Rubens style.

== Life ==
Gaspar de Crayer was born in Antwerp as the son of Gaspard de Crayer the Elder, a decorative painter, illuminator and art dealer. His mother Christina van Abshoven or Apshoven descended from a family of painters who at the time enjoyed some fame, but whose work is barely known now. Rather than stay in Antwerp, he looked for opportunity in the capital Brussels. He is believed to have studied under Raphael Coxie, the court painter of the governors of the Spanish Netherlands Albert VII, Archduke of Austria and Isabella Clara Eugenia. He became a master in the Brussels Guild of Saint Luke in 1607. He was a dean of the Guild from 1611 to 1616 and was a member of the Brussels City Council in 1626–1627. He remained in Brussels until 1664.

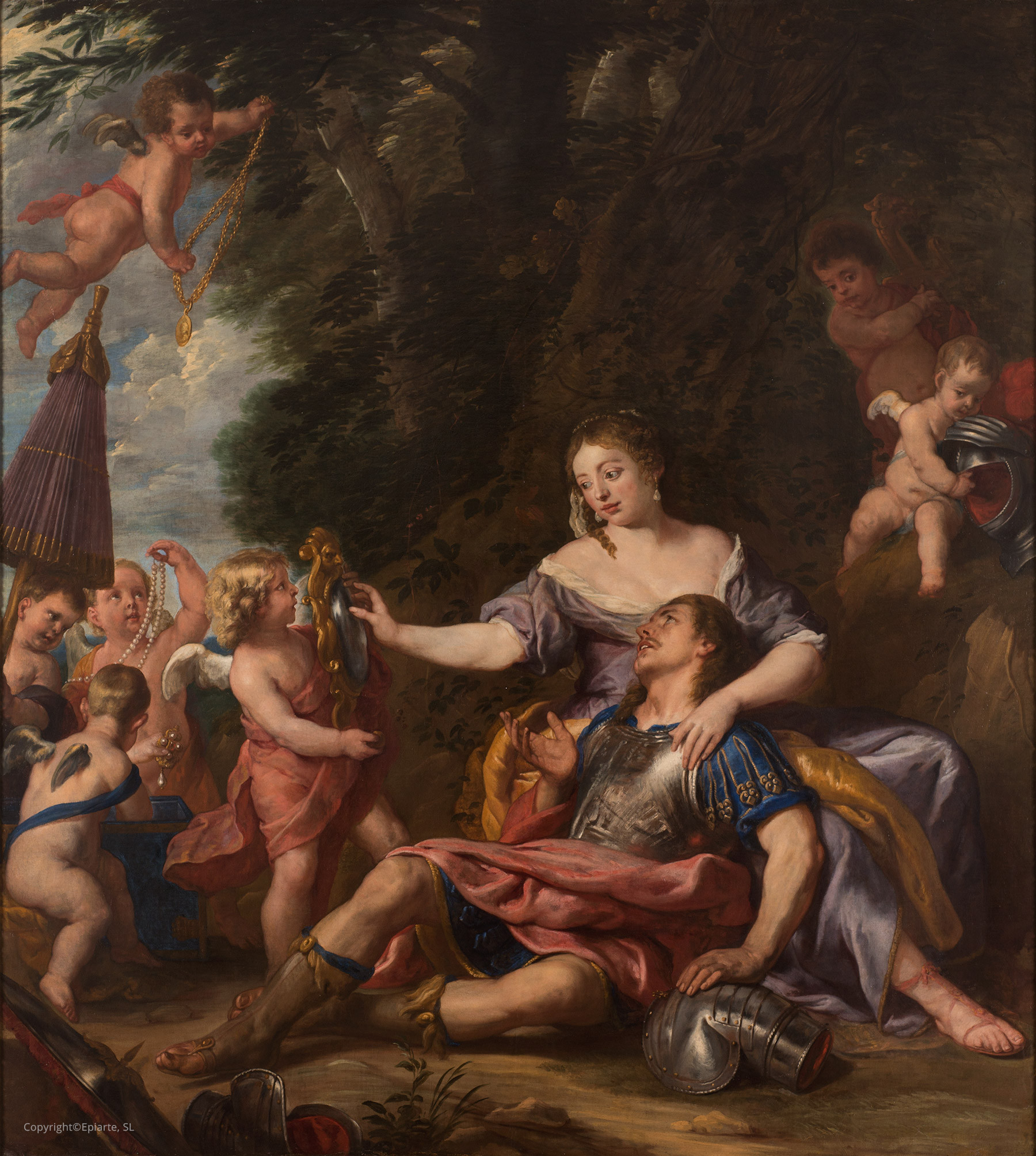
Rinaldo and Armida

De Crayer's early works include portraits of the kings of Spain and the Spanish governors and officials who were stationed in the Spanish Netherlands as well as members of the Brussels city council. For example, the Equestrian portrait of Don Diego Messia Felipe de Guzmán (Kunsthistorisches Museum, Vienna) was painted by de Crayer in 1627–1628. In addition, from the beginning of his career de Crayer received orders for altarpieces to decorate several churches and monasteries around Brussels. Although he was still living in Brussels, he played a leading role in the coordination of the monumental decorations for the Joyous Entry of Cardinal-Infante Ferdinand of Austria, brother of King Philip IV of Spain, as governor of the Spanish Netherlands in 1635. He created one of the two triumphal arches on the Vrijdagmarkt in Ghent, depicting scenes of the illustrious deeds of Ferdinand's Ghent-born great-grandfather Charles V. The Cardinal-Infante made him his first court painter in the same year. He later worked as a court painter for the Archduke Leopold Wilhelm of Austria who became governor in 1647.

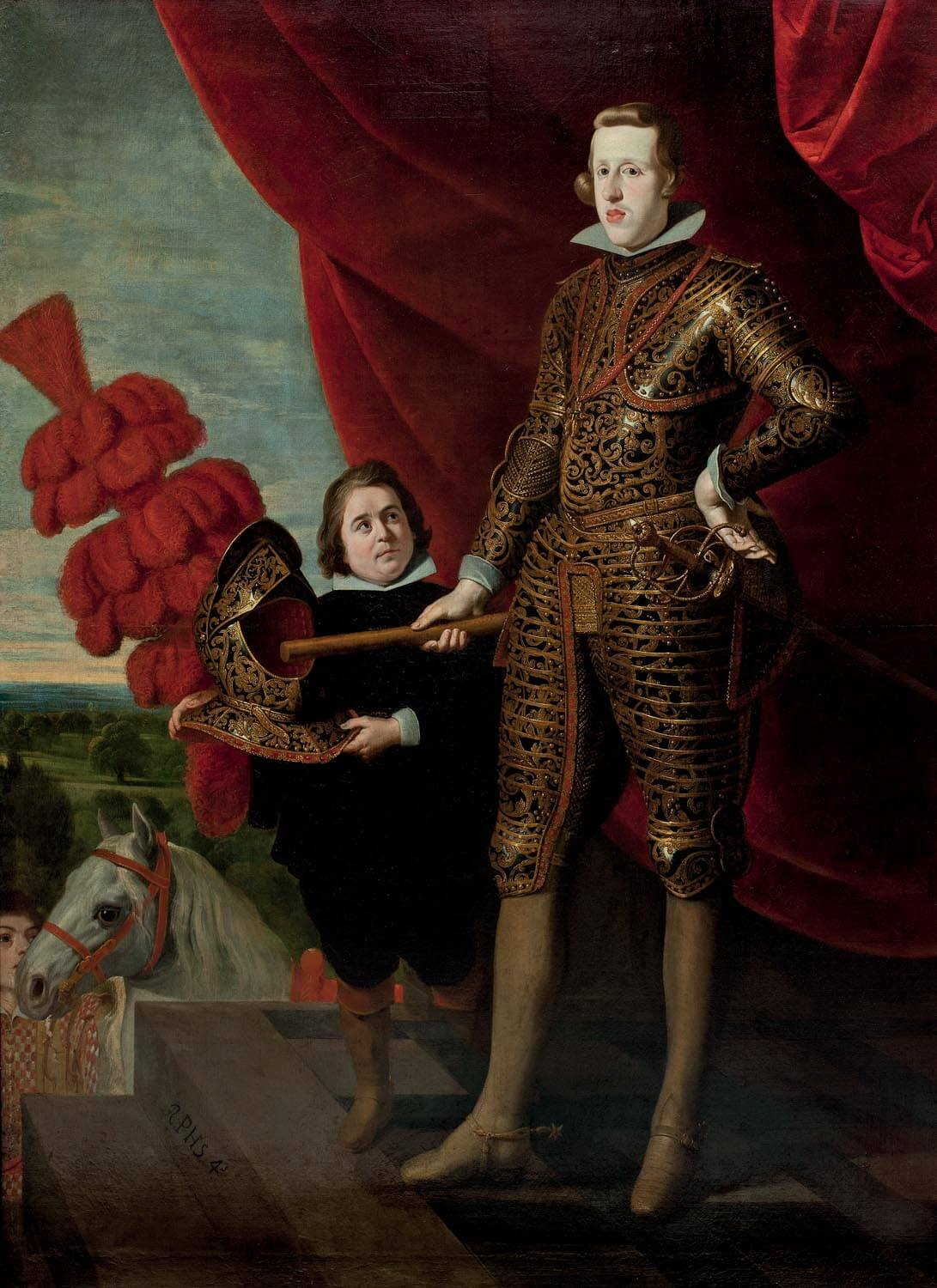
Philip IV with court dwarf

He operated a large workshop which produced portraits of members of the leading classes in Brussels as well as a large number of altarpieces for churches in Flanders and abroad including Germany and Spain. He also received in 1647 a commission from Dutch architect Jacob van Campen to assist in the decoration of Huis ten Bosch, the palace of stadtholder Frederick Henry in The Hague. De Crayer also completed commissions for Spanish patrons, the largest of which was a commission for at least 17 images of saints, possibly destined for the Monastery of St Francis in Burgos. Another important foreign patron was the German Catholic ruler Maximilian Willibald of Waldburg-Wolfegg, for whom de Crayer executed several large altarpieces for the churches in the Palatinate between 1658 and 1666.

Even while he gained a high social position in Brussels, de Crayer did not lose contact with his hometown Antwerp. He was in particular a friend and business associate of the art dealer Matthijs Musson (c. 1600–78), who was also his patron and arranged commissions for him. He married Catharina Janssens on 17 February 1613.

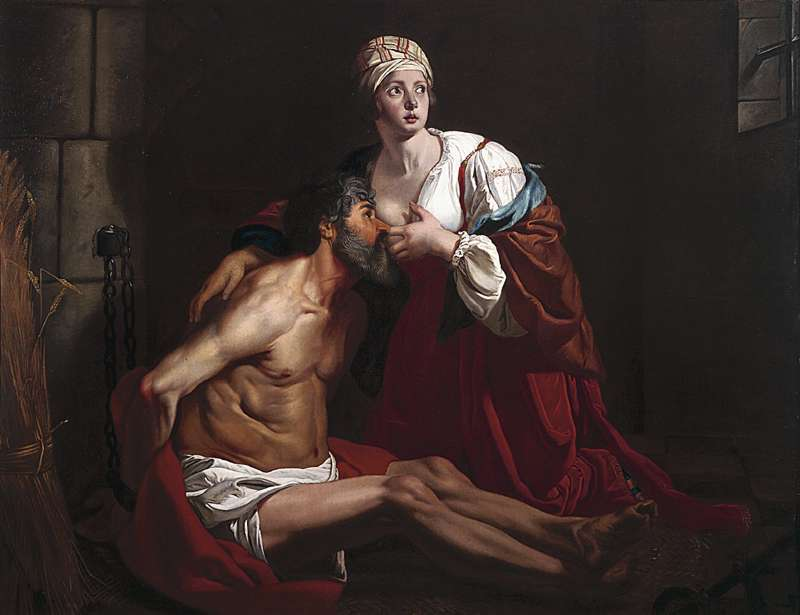
Caritas Romana, 1645

He worked regularly in Ghent where he produced altarpieces. He had previously established a reputation in Ghent: before 1620 he had regularly completed commissions for various religious and secular institutions of the city and he been given an important role in the execution of the monumental decorations for the Joyous Entry into Ghent of Cardinal-Infante Ferdinand of Austria in 1635. In 1664 he finally moved to this city where he spent the last five years of his life. In spite of his age, he received numerous important orders for altarpieces. Among the numerous paintings made in Ghent stand out the Martyrdom of St. Blas and the works that are in the Saint Bavo's Cathedral.

In his large workshop de Crayer trained between 1610 and 1661 a large number of pupils, including presumably Jan van Cleve (III), Anselm van Hulle and François Monnaville.

Gaspar de Crayer died on 27 January 1669 in Ghent.

== Work ==
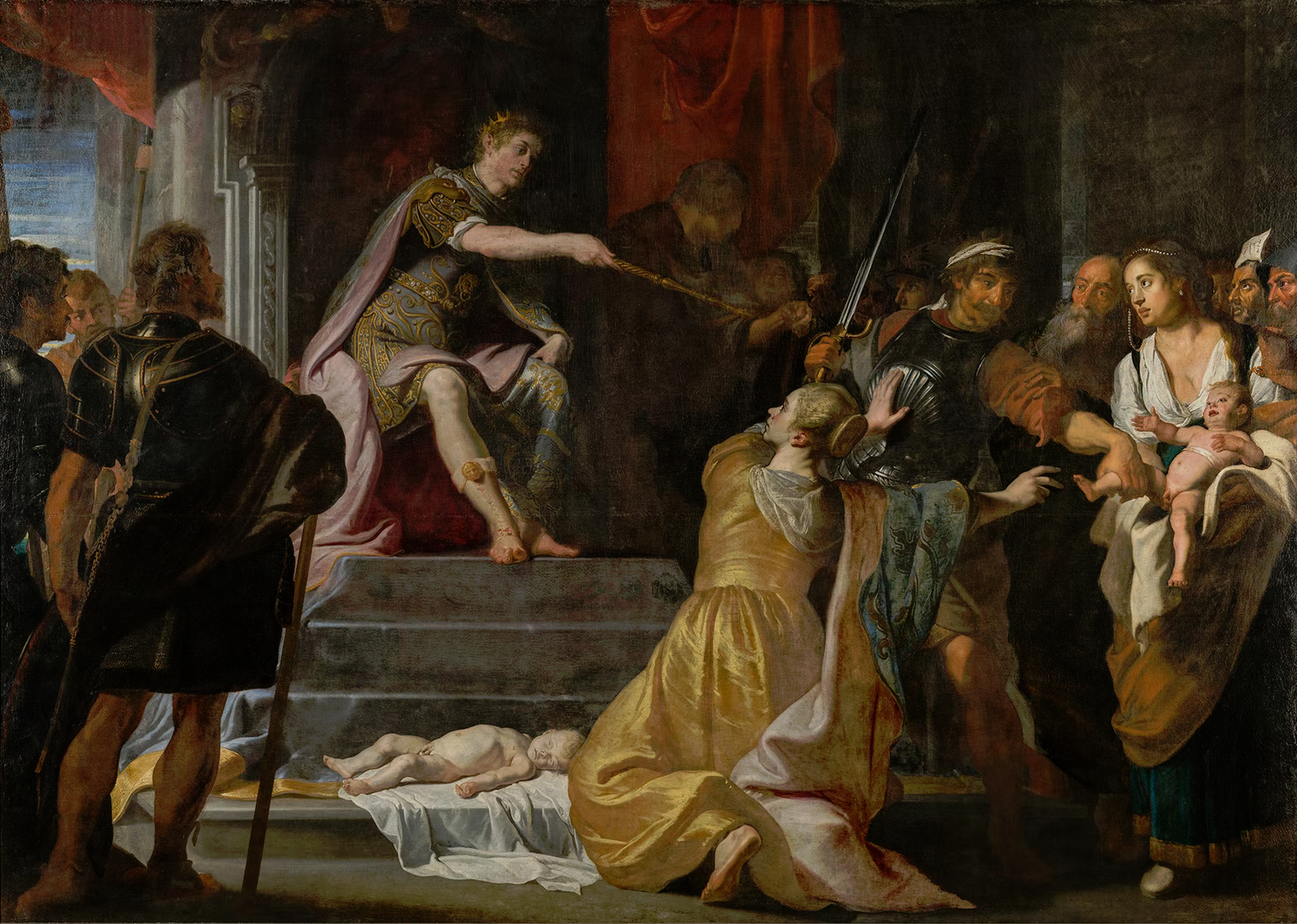
The Judgement of Solomon

Gaspar de Crayer mainly painted portraits of the elite and Counter Reformation altarpieces for local and foreign churches. His early work is in the trend of the 16th century tradition of artists such as Maerten de Vos of Antwerp and Hendrik de Clerck of Brussels who worked in a late Mannerist style. Typical for this style is the unnatural perspective and the crowding of long wooden figures in the foreground. From 1618 he came under the influence of Rubens. The level of borrowing of motifs from Rubens suggests that he had some form of contract with the workshop of Rubens since he could only have seen some models there. The influence is shown in a more monumental rendering of figures in more balanced compositions. Until 1630, de Crayer followed the style of Rubens' Classicist period. The work Mocking of Job (1619, Musée des Augustins, Toulouse) is an example of this style.

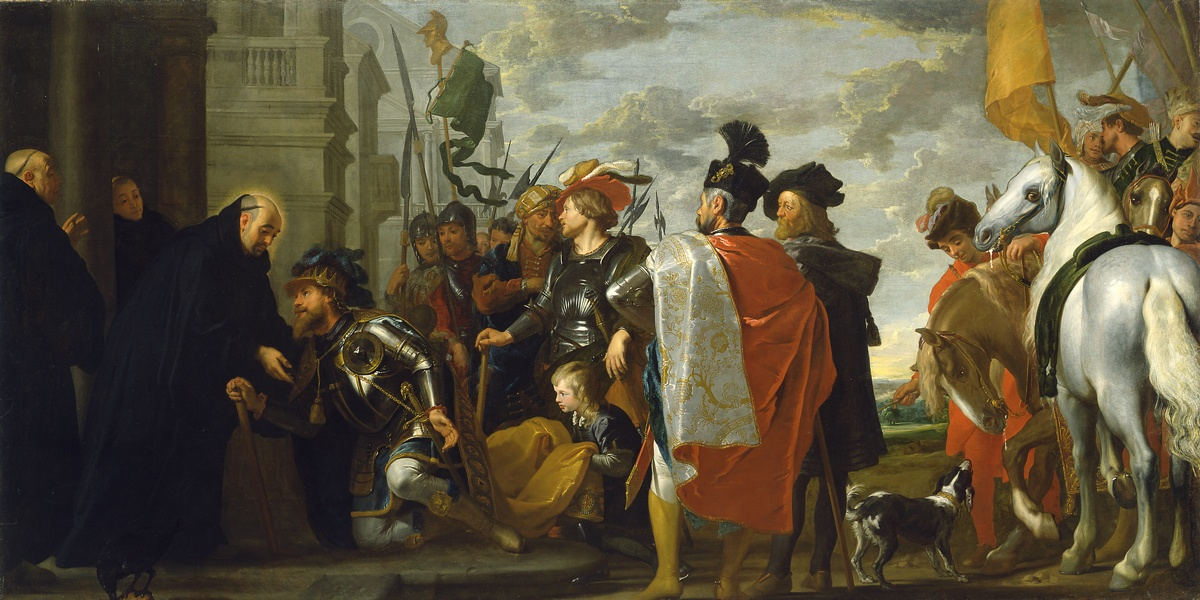
Saint Benedict receiving Totila, King of the Ostrogoths

After 1630 his work was more influenced by Anthony van Dyck, whose emotionally charged interpretation of religious subjects appealed to his sensibility. His work became more dynamic in conception. He also was influenced by van Dyck's work, which especially in his later work lapsed into pathos.

Between 1638 and 1648 de Crayer's compositions displayed a lighter tonality and his figures became softer and more sentimental in appearance. This may have been under the influence of the later work of Rubens. His work also showed a trace of the Venetian 16th-century masters, in particular the art of Titian and Paolo Veronese. De Crayer, however, never visited Italy and he mainly knew the work through the prints of Agostino Carracci.

In the 1650s and 1660s, de Crayer's art became more emotionally loaded and more dramatic through the deployment of a relatively large number of figures at various planes within the picture space. In the last period, a lot of work produced by his workshop surfaced and his rich and warm palette became increasingly dull.

== Gallery ==
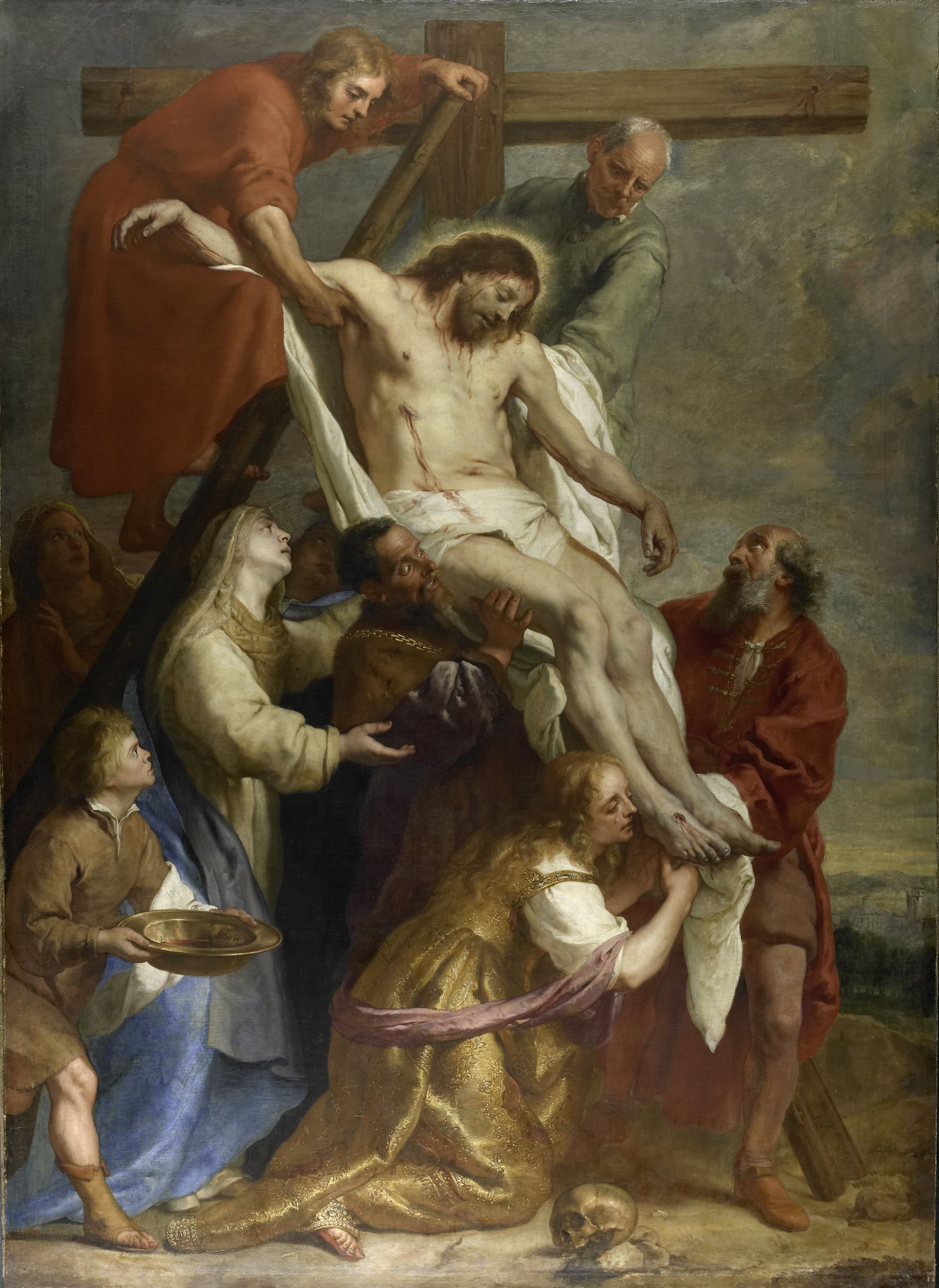
Descent from the Cross

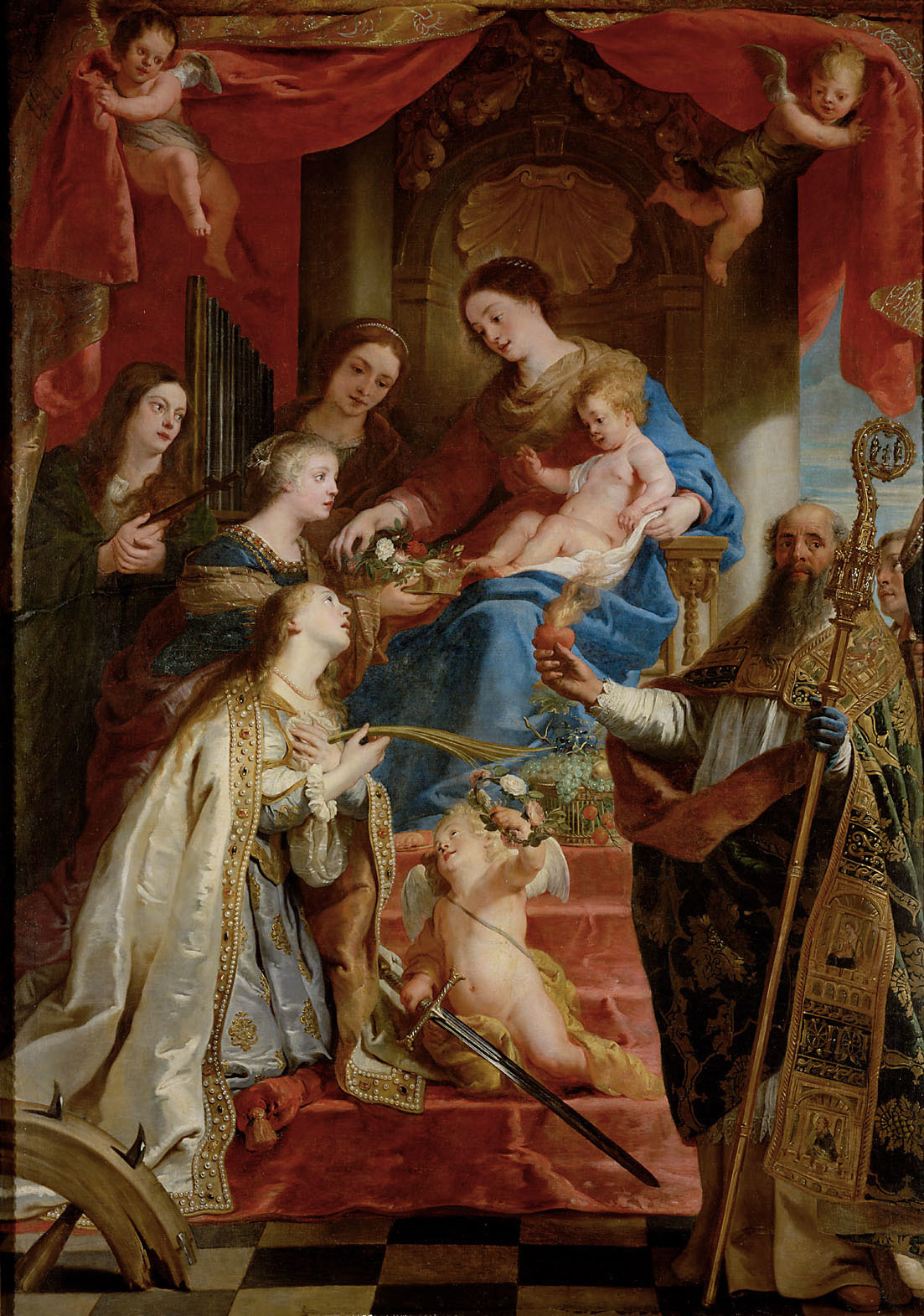
Virgin with child and saints Mary Magdalene, Cecilia, Dorothea, Catherine and Augustine

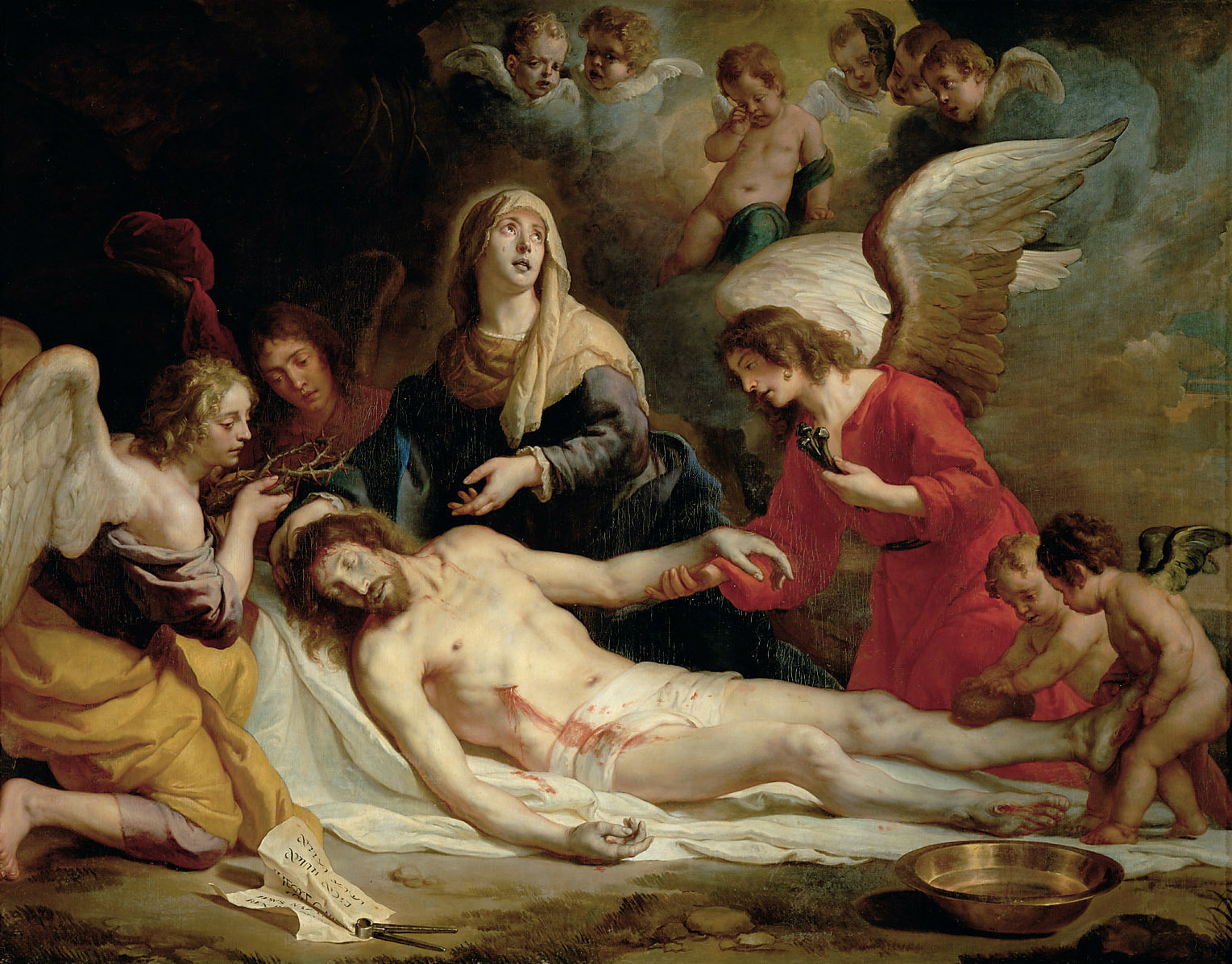
Lamentation of Christ

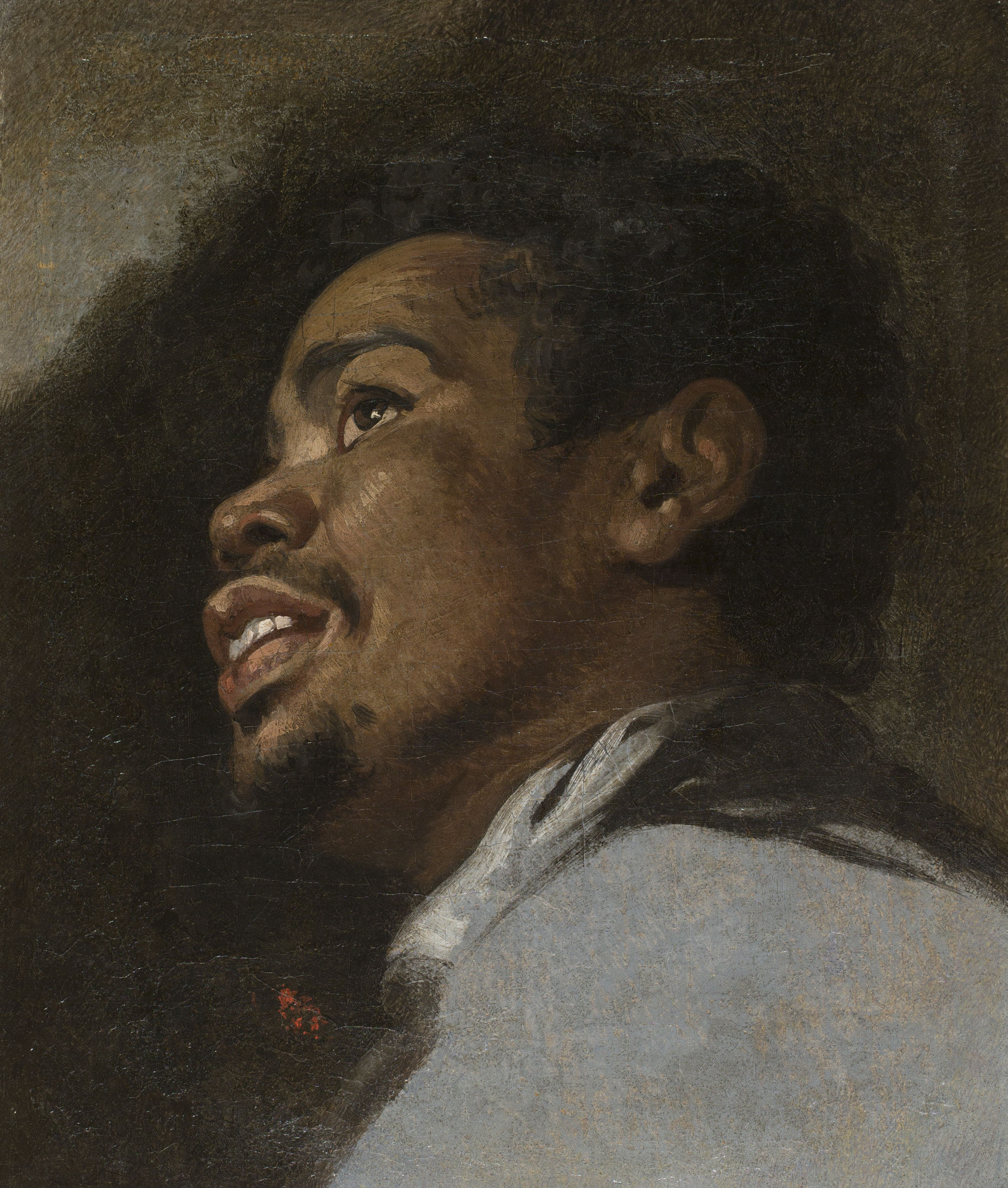
Head of a Young Moor Museum of Fine Arts, Ghent
