= Carlo Marchionni =

Italian architect (1702–1786)

- Garden front of the Villa Albani, engraved by Giambattista Piranesi.
- Born: 10 February 1702; Rome, Papal States
- Died: 28 July 1786 (aged 84); Rome, Papal States
- Burial place: Gesù e Maria, Rome
- Education: Accademia di San Luca
- Occupation: Architect
- Movement: Baroque
- Practice: Filippo Barigioni

Carlo Marchionni (10 February 1702 – 28 July 1786) was an Italian architect. He was also a sculptor and a virtuoso draughtsman, who mixed in the artistic and intellectual circles. He was born and died in Rome.

== Biography ==
Marchionni's early career was fostered by his lifelong friend Cardinal Alessandro Albani, a great collector of antiquities. His mature style exhibits a richly detailed idiomatic repertory on the cusp of Late Baroque and Neoclassicism that may be compared with the similar style by his Italian contemporaries Alessandro Galilei, Ferdinando Fuga or Vanvitelli, or indeed with their French contemporary, Ange-Jacques Gabriel, who designed the (Petit Trianon)

Marchionni's earliest training was as a sculptor. He studied architecture at Rome's Accademia di San Luca, as pupil of Filippo Barigioni, who favored the elaborated style of Borromini. In 1728 Marchionni had come to Albani's attention after winning first prize in the academy's Concorso Clementino. Marchionni's Borromini-influenced style is identifiable in Marchionni's early work (1728) for Cardinal Albani's villa at Anzio and at the papal retreat of Castel Gandolfo.

Marchionni helped restore and rebuild the choir at San Giovanni in Laterano along with Giovanni Battista Piranesi, who is best known for his etchings of Roman ruins. Piranesi's picturesque approach to Roman antiquity likely influenced Marchionni's style. However, Marchionni's mature work, such as the Villa Albani (1746–63) expresses the courtly decorative classicism of his patron's circle, which included the neoclassicist Winckelmann, curator of Albani's antiquities. After Nicola Salvi's death in 1751, Marchionni help design the Villa's garden façade (illustration, right) is without central emphasis or end pavilions, a single sequence of bays defined by an order of Corinthian pilasters standing on rusticated pilasters of an arcade with arch-head openings of "Palladian" form. The whole façade is surmounted by a running balustrade that emphasizes its linearity. The balustrades, herms and stone vases of the Gardens must be from designs of Marchionni (Gatta).

Marchionni was appointed papal architect and overseer of works at St Peter's Basilica by Pope Benedict XIV. In 1766, the pope commissioned Marchionni to rebuild the entrance façade of the Museo Profano, the papal collection of antiquities originally displayed by Bramante in the Braccia Nuova of the Vatican, along one side of the Cortile del Belvedere.

Two commissions from Pope Pius VI constituted Marchionni's last official Roman projects. One was the new sacristy for St Peter's (1776–84), which had been envisaged by the preceding pontiff, who demolished the mausoleum dedicated to the Madonna of the Fevers that stood on its site. The project was preceded by a public competition. Giovanni Domenico Porta's commemorative canvas from 1776 (now in Palazzo Braschi) shows Pope Pius presenting two large sheets depicting a plan and elevation, which are open upon a draped table. However, the plans in the painting are identified from a detailed contemporary description as those submitted by Giuseppe Subleyras, whereas in the engraving by Camillo Tinti (1780), Marchionni's plans has been substituted, and the half-built sacristy, complete to the first floor, appears in the background view (engraving found at Palazzo Braschi). The imposing Sacristy, an independent building as large as a church, is sited in the angle of the left transept. It consists of the octagonal Sagrestia Comune, the Sacristy of the Canons, and the Sala of the Chapter. It is connected to the basilica by raised galleries in which Marchionni inserted fragments of Roman bas reliefs.

Marchionni also designed church furnishings, such as the high altar and rich tabernacle of Santa Caterina a Magnanapoli (1787). Cardinal Albani commissioned from Marchionni the funerary monument (1737–39) located in Santa Maria sopra Minerva, with sculpture by his frequent collaborator Pietro Bracci, to honor Pope Benedict XIII. Marchionni's contribution was limited to a pictorial bas-relief on the sarcophagus, and it may be questioned how much of the Roman sculpture attributed to his design was by his hand: statuary (1741) for the façade of Santa Maria Maggiore; Benedict XIV (1743) for Santa Croce in Gerusalemme; St Ignatius Loyola (1748) for S Apollinare; and patrons' busts (ca. 1745) for the Collegio di Propaganda Fide. Outside Rome is credited with reliefs depicting scenes from the Life of the Virgin (1747) for the chapel of St John the Baptist, Sao Roch, Lisbon, and for the chapel of the Madonna del Voto (1748) in the Duomo of Siena and the funerary monument (1747) of Cardinal Giacomo Millo in San Crisogono in Rome.

Outside Rome, Cardinal Albani commissioned a façade for the collegiate church at Nettuno (1734). He received papal commissions for the churches of San Domenico in Ancona (from 1763) and Santa Maddalena de Cassinessi in Messina (from 1765). As an engineer, he was responsible for work in the port of Ancona overseen by Luigi Vanvitelli.

Throughout his career his scenographic talents were called upon for the temporary decorations required for public events, which are documented in preparatory drawings or presentation drawings, some of which, such as a canonization in Santa Maria sopra Minerva in 1746, have only been recognized as Marchionni's in recent years Similar drawings by Marchionni are at the Cooper-Hewitt, New York.

Not all of Marchionni's drawings are architectural designs. Two albums of his drawings were acquired by the Louvre

The developing Neoclassicism soon dismissed Marchionni's conservative classicised Baroque style. While Winckelmann had hailed the Villa Albani as "the most beautiful building of our time", in a letter to the Venetian connoisseur Girolamo Zulian, Francesco Milizia dismissed the "Marchionnisti", "Michelangiolisti", "Berniniani" and "Borrominiani" as reactionary obscurantists who execrated the young Antonio Canova's fully classical monument to Pope Clement XIV of 1787. Marchioni became principe or director of the Accademia di San Luca starting from 1775.
