= Thomas van Apshoven =

Flemish painter

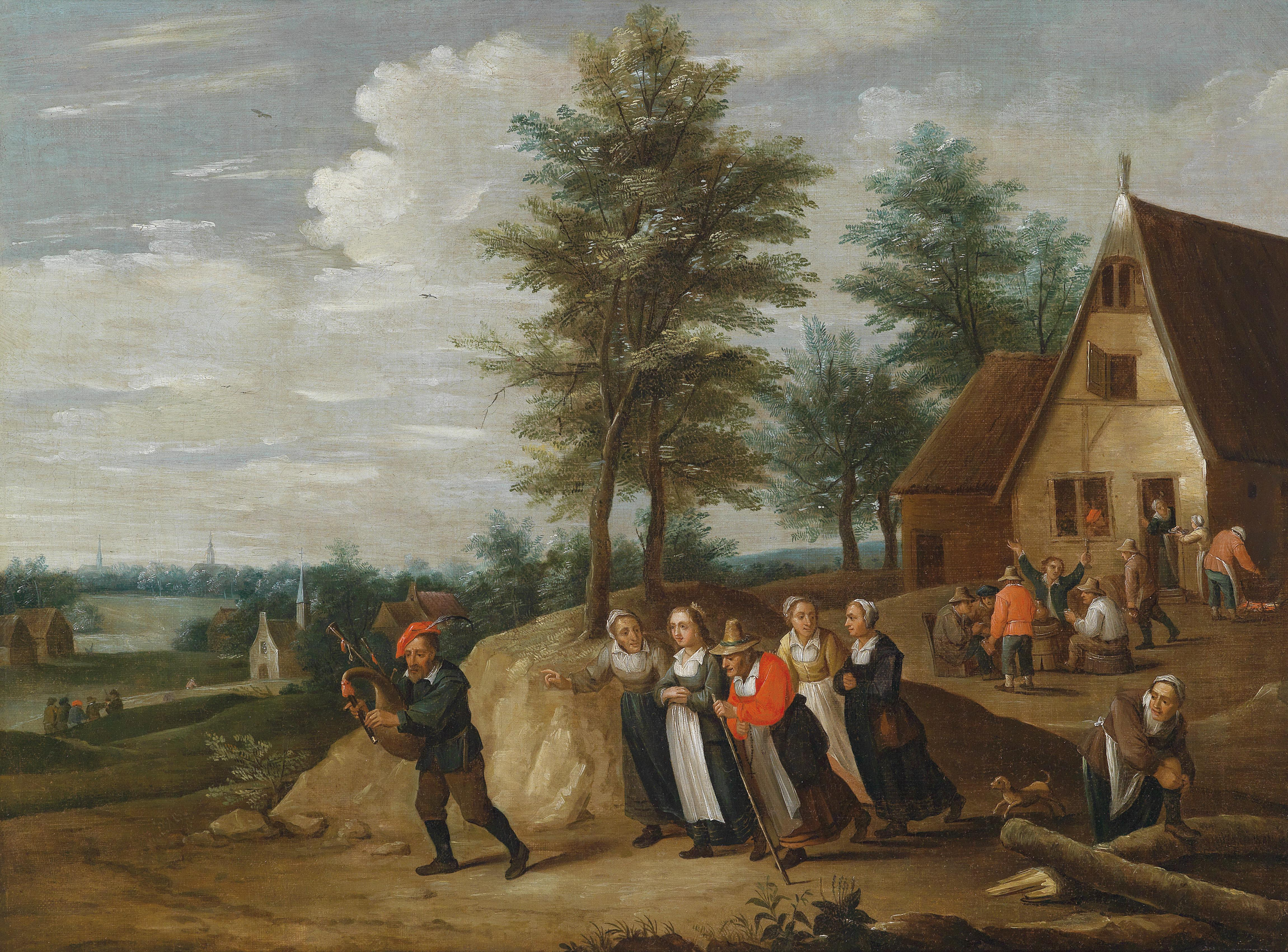
Rural landscape with a bagpiper followed by peasant women

Thomas van Apshoven (1622 – 1664/7) was a Flemish painter known for his landscapes with peasant scenes and genre scenes in interiors. His genre scenes depict village festivals, the interiors of taverns, village scenes or landscapes with peasants engaged in various activities, singeries, guardroom scenes and laboratories of alchemists. Some still lifes have also been attributed to him. His themes and style are close to that of David Teniers the Younger.

== Life ==
He was born on 30 November 1622 in Antwerp as the eldest son of Ferdinand van Apshoven the Elder and Leonora Wijns. His father was a painter who had studied with Adam van Noort and had become a master of the Antwerp Guild of Saint Luke in 1596. No paintings by his father are known. His younger brother Ferdinand van Apshoven the Younger became also a successful painter.

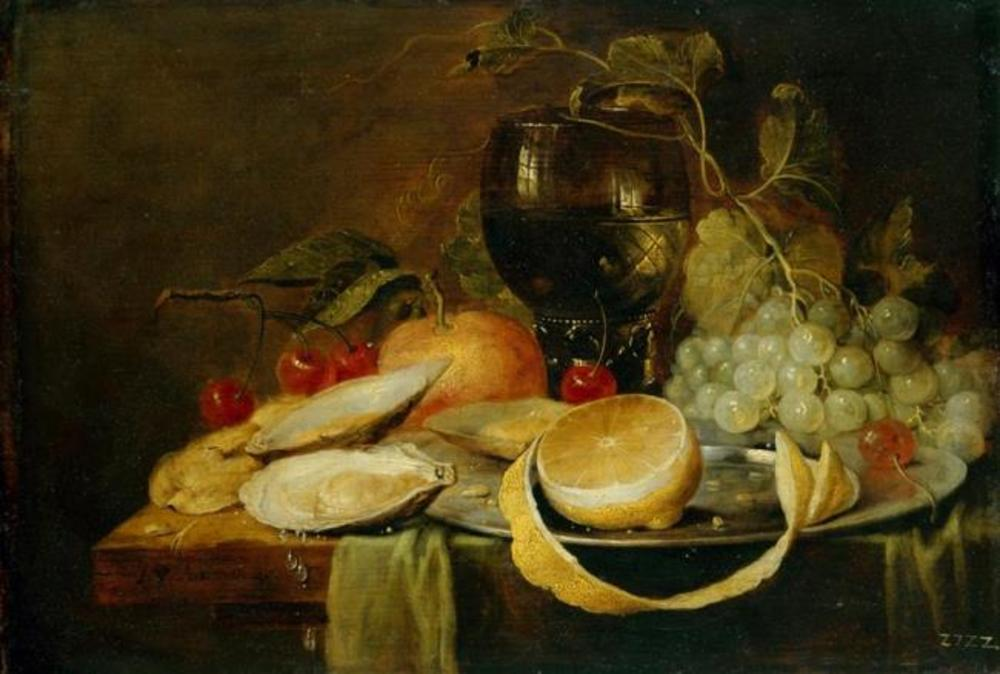
Still life of fruit, a roemer, oysters and a plate with a lemon

Thomas studied under his father. Some sources state that he became a pupil of the prominent genre painter David Teniers the Younger. It is more likely, however, that he was an imitator of Teniers. He was registered as a 'wijnmeester' [son of a master] in the Guild of St. Luke of Antwerp in the guild year 1645–1646. He married Barbara Janssens on 22 March 1645. The couple had four children. The godfathers of the children included the painters Victor Wolfvoet and Jan van Kessel the Elder. Jan van Kessel was married to his sister Maria van Apshoven.

As his father had been the captain of the local civil militia he was in 1657 also made captain, a position which he held until his death. Heyndrick van Voer was his pupil in the guild year 1650–1651.

He died sometime between 18 September 1664, and the same day in the following year.

== Work ==
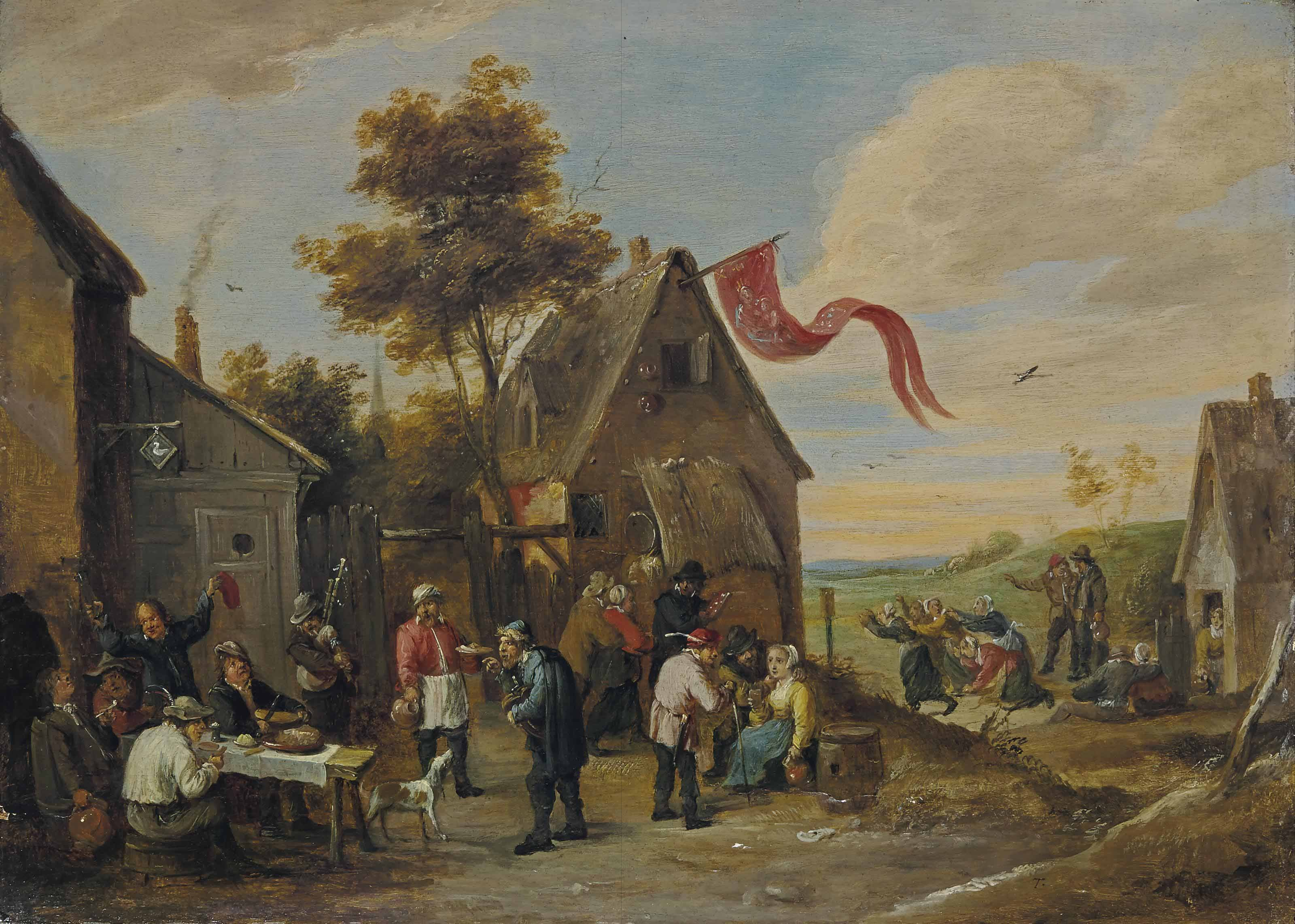
The Kermesse of Saint George with peasants feasting before an inn

Van Apshoven was mainly a genre painter. He signed his works in capital letters or with the simple monogramme TA or TVA.

His genre scenes depict most of the subject matter also covered by David Teniers the Younger: village festivals, the interiors of taverns, village scenes or landscapes with peasants engaged in various activities, singeries, guardroom scenes and laboratories of alchemists. His style is also close to that of Teniers although he was less skilled in the rendering of figures. Some of his works have likely been attributed to Teniers. He also made copies after works of Teniers such as the Old woman and two peasants in a barn with a splendid kitchen still life (Dorotheum (Vienna) auction of 17 October 2007, lot 440). He also copied works of followers of Teniers such as David Ryckaert III.

A still life of Fruit, a roemer, oysters and a plate with a lemon has also been attributed to him (Gemäldegalerie Alte Meister). It carries the signature "T. V. APSHOVEN".
