= Edwin van den Oord =

Dutch psychiatric geneticist (born 1963)

- Born: Eduardus Johannes Cornelis Gerardus van den Oord; 19 April 1963 (age 63); Oegstgeest, Netherlands
- Other name: Edwin J.C.G. van den Oord
- Education: Erasmus University Rotterdam
- Scientific career
- Fields: Psychiatric genetics
- Workplaces: Virginia Commonwealth University
- Thesis: A genetic study of problem behaviors in children (1993)
- Doctoral advisors: Frank Verhulst; Dorret Boomsma

Eduardus Johannes Cornelis Gerardus van den Oord (born 19 April 1963) is a Dutch psychiatric geneticist. He is Professor and Director of the Center for Biomarker Research and Personalized Medicine at Virginia Commonwealth University in Richmond, Virginia, United States.
