= Ferdinand van Apshoven the Younger =

Flemish painter and art dealer

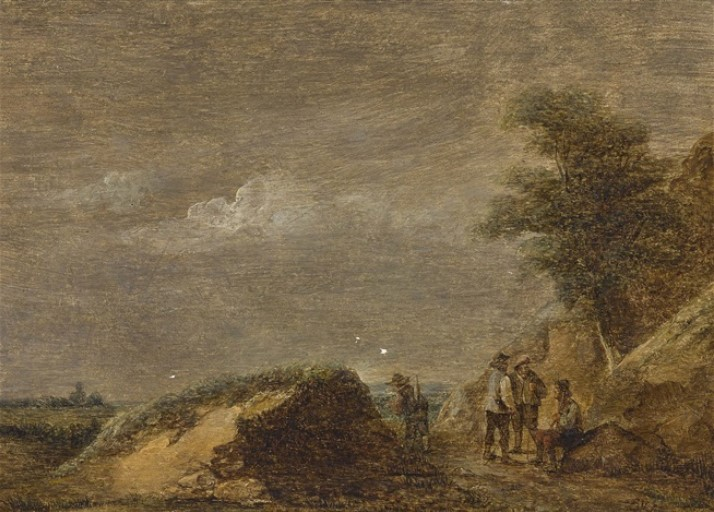
Peasants on a country road

Ferdinand van Apshoven the Younger or Ferdinand van Apshoven II (baptized 1 March 1630 – buried 3 April 1694) was a Flemish painter and art dealer. He painted mainly genre scenes of peasants and taverns in the style of David Teniers the Younger. He was the brother of the better known painter Thomas van Apshoven who was also a follower of David Teniers.

== Life ==
Ferdinand van Apshoven the Younger was born in Antwerp as the son of Ferdinand van Apshoven the Elder and Leonora Wijns. His father was a painter who had studied with Adam van Noort and had become a master of the Antwerp Guild of Saint Luke in 1596. No paintings by his father are known. Ferdinand had 7 siblings of whom his brother Thomas was a successful painter of genre scenes.

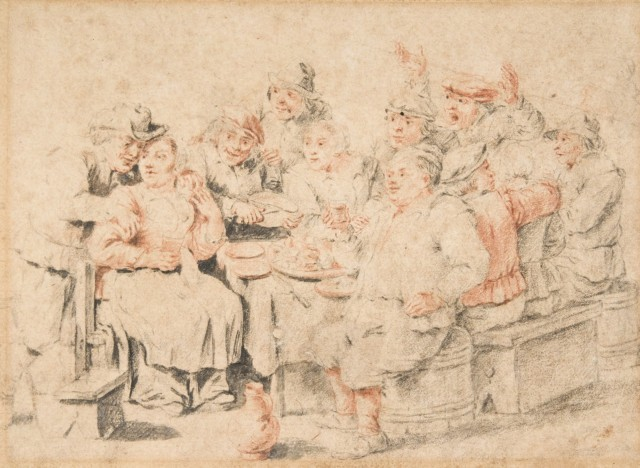
Merry company

He is believed to have studied with his father and some sources insist that he also was a pupil of David Teniers the Younger. He travelled abroad since it is reported that he was abroad when his father died on 8 November 1654. Upon his return to Antwerp in 1657 he was registered as a master painter and art dealer in the Guild in the capacity of a wijnmeester' (son of a master).

He married Josine Overstraeten (also referred to as Josina van Overstraeten) in the St. Walburga Church on 20 January 1657. The couple had two sons and three daughters. Their youngest son Willem (baptized 5 September 1664 in the St. Walburga Church) was enrolled in the Antwerp guild as a pupil of Joseph de la Morlet, but was never registered as a master.

Van Apshoven was captain of the local Schutterij (civil militia) from 13 December 1664 to 8 August 1679. Van Apshoven's wife died in the year 1669 or 1670. The painter Balthasar-Lucas Boel became on 26 November 1674 guardian of the children of Ferdinand van Apshoven and the late Josina van Overstraeten. In 1675 Ferdinand van Apshoven was together with Balthasar-Lucas Boel a guardian of the children of the late Louys du Pré.

He became dean of the Guild between 18 September 1678 and 18 September 1679 but the function was in fact performed by Martin Verhulst (I). When he died he lived in a house on the Blouwhantse Ruy in Antwerp.

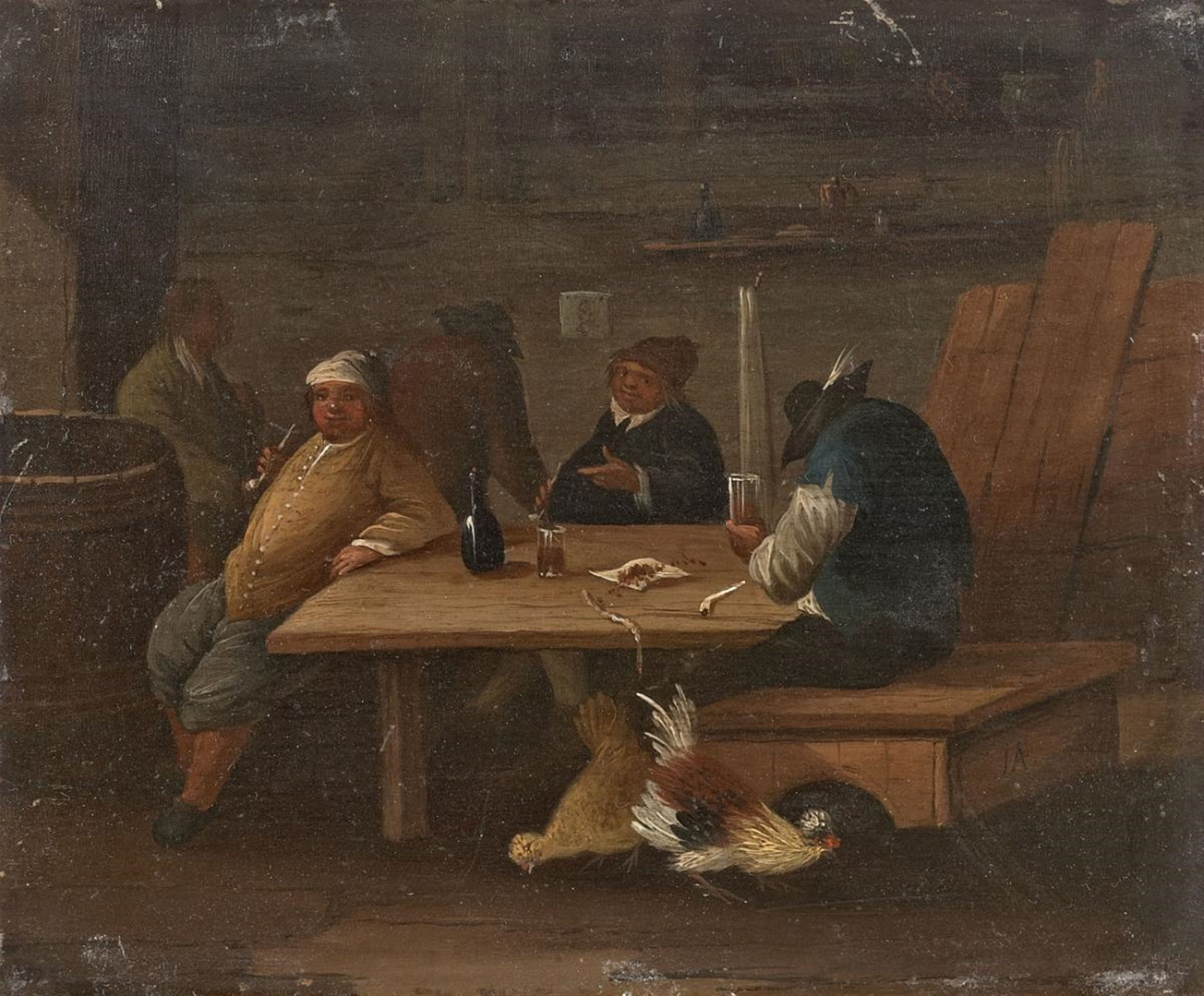
Drinkers and smokers in an interior

His pupils include Melsen de Grée (or Melchior de Gra).

== Work ==
Van Apshoven was mainly active as an art dealer. His known works are in the style and treat the same genre subjects as David Teniers the younger. Some of his works have been attributed erroneously to Teniers.

Van Apshoven is particularly known for his scenes of peasants, tavern interiors, rural landscapes and singeries. He may also have painted still lifes.
