= Ortt (surname) =

Ortt is a surname, and may refer to:

- Felix Ortt (1866–1959), Dutch writer and reformer
- Jocelyn Ortt-Saeed (1935–2014), Australian-Pakistani poet
- Rob Ortt (born 1979), American politician

== See also ==
- Ort (surname)
