= Oral pressure therapy =

Treatment for obstructive sleep apnea (OSA)

- Specialty: Sleep medicine

Oral pressure therapy (OPT) is a treatment for obstructive sleep apnea (OSA) that uses negative pressure in the mouth to shift the soft palate and tongue forward. The negative pressure is created by a bedside console connected by a small tube to a mouthpiece worn inside the mouth during sleep. The device is successful in between a quarter and a third of people.

== Medical uses ==
While oral pressure therapy resulted in some benefit, most people were not fully treated by its use. The device was successful in between a quarter and a third of people.

== Contraindications ==
Oral pressure therapy should not be used to treat central sleep apnea or by anyone who has a severe respiratory disorder (e.g., severe lung disease, pneumothorax), has loose teeth or advanced periodontal disease, or is under the age of 18.

== Mechanism ==
Unlike CPAP, oral pressure therapy does not apply pressure directly to the airway, but applies light negative pressure in the oral cavity. With this system, the user breathes normally through the nose with the mouth closed. Unlike mandibular repositioning devices (also known as oral appliances and dental devices), oral pressure therapy does not pull the lower jaw forward.

== Regulation ==
One oral pressure therapy device has been cleared by the United States Food and Drug Administration for sale in the United States with a prescription (the Winx sleep therapy system).
