= Frank Verhulst =

Dutch psychiatrist

Frank C. Verhulst
- Born: Frank Cornelis Verhulst; August 18, 1951 (age 74); Rotterdam, the Netherlands
- Education: Erasmus University
- Scientific career
- Fields: Psychiatry
- Institutions: Erasmus MC; University of Copenhagen

Frank Cornelis Verhulst (born August 18, 1951) is a Dutch psychiatrist and epidemiologist who is a research professor at Erasmus MC in Rotterdam, the Netherlands. He is also an adjunct professor in the Department of Clinical Medicine at the University of Copenhagen in Copenhagen, Denmark. His research focuses mainly on child psychopathology and psychiatric epidemiology.
