= Anthoni van Noordt =

Dutch composer and organist

Anthoni van Noordt (c. 1619 – 23 March 1675) was a Dutch composer and organist.

Born in Amsterdam, where he lived throughout his life, he was the brother of Jacobus and Jan van Noordt. He became the organist of the Nieuwezijdskapel in 1652, and moved to take up a post at the Nieuwe Kerk in 1664, where he remained until 1673.

His known compositions are all for organ, and are in the tradition of Jan Pieterszoon Sweelinck and the North German school. There are ten psalm settings, of which nine include variations, and six fugal fantasias. The works are of a high quality, showing contrapuntal mastery and a sure technique. The works were printed in a Tabulatuur-boeck van psalmen en fantasyen (Amsterdam, 1659), now in the library of the Jagiellonian University, Kraków; the notation used is unusual, with manual parts on two six-line staves (known as Anglo-Dutch notation) and the pedal part underneath in German organ tablature.

== Sources ==
- Randall H. Tollefsen/Johan Giskes, 'Noordt [Noort, Noord, Oort, Oord], van', Grove Music Online ed. L. Macy (Accessed 2007-06-10), http://www.grovemusic.com/
