= Noort =

Noort is a Dutch surname meaning "north". may refer to:

- Ae-Ri Noort (born 1983), Dutch rowing coxswain
- Saskia Noort (born 1967), Dutch crime-writer and freelance journalist

== See also ==
- North (surname)
- Van Noort, surname
