= Ginie Van De Noort =

Ginie Van de Noort
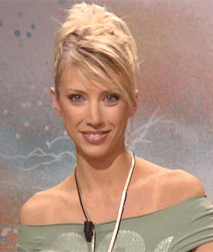
- Ginie Van de Noort
- Born: 25 December 1979 (age 46); Compiègne, France
- Occupation: Television presenter / Journalist

Ginie Van de Noort (born December 25, 1979, in Compiègne, Oise) is a French journalist, and television presenter.

== Biography ==
Ginie Van De Noort was born in Compiègne, where she spent her childhood.

She studied journalism and graduate at CELSA and Institut français de presse.

She arrived in Paris in 1998 and began at RTL French radio station during three years, alongside Philippe Labro, Nagui and Christophe Dechavanne.

Discovered in 2000 by a modeling agency, she walked for the most famous (Yves Saint Laurent, Sonia Rykiel, Christian Dior, Christian Lacroix,...).

Subsequently, one can regularly see her in La Grosse Emission on Comedy! channel and On a tout essayé on France 2 channel.

At the launch of Direct 8 channel in 2005, Vincent Bolloré gave her a daily prime time show Avant tout le monde.

She hosted this daily for three years, along with a program devoted to fashion Fashion 8.

In June 2006, at the launch of daily Direct Soir, Vincent Bolloré also asked her to work for his daily.

Today she works for print magazines, such as L'Équipe, ELLE, L'Optimum and A Nous Paris.

== Filmography ==
- 2001 : Ma Femme est une actrice, Yvan Attal
- 2002 : France boutique, Tonie Marshall
- 2005 : L'amour aux trousses, Philippe de Chauveron
