= Ferdinand van Apshoven the Elder =

Ferdinand van Apshoven, "the Elder", is recorded to have been baptized at Antwerp on 17 May 1576. In 1592–93, he entered the atelier of Adam van Noort and, in 1596–97, he was free of the Guild of Painters of that city. He was both an historical painter and a portraitist, but no work by him exists. That he was successful as a teacher in art is evident, for the records of the Guild mention seven pupils of his. He died in 1654 or 1655.

He is the father of painter Thomas van Apshoven (1622–1664/7) and painter and art dealer Ferdinand van Apshoven the Younger (1630–1694).
