= Jan van Noordt =

Dutch painter

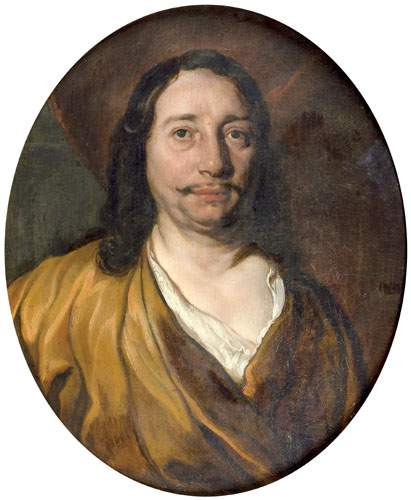
Jan van Noordt, Self-Portrait, c. 1670. Oil on canvas, 61.2 × 51.7 cm. Amsterdam, private collection.

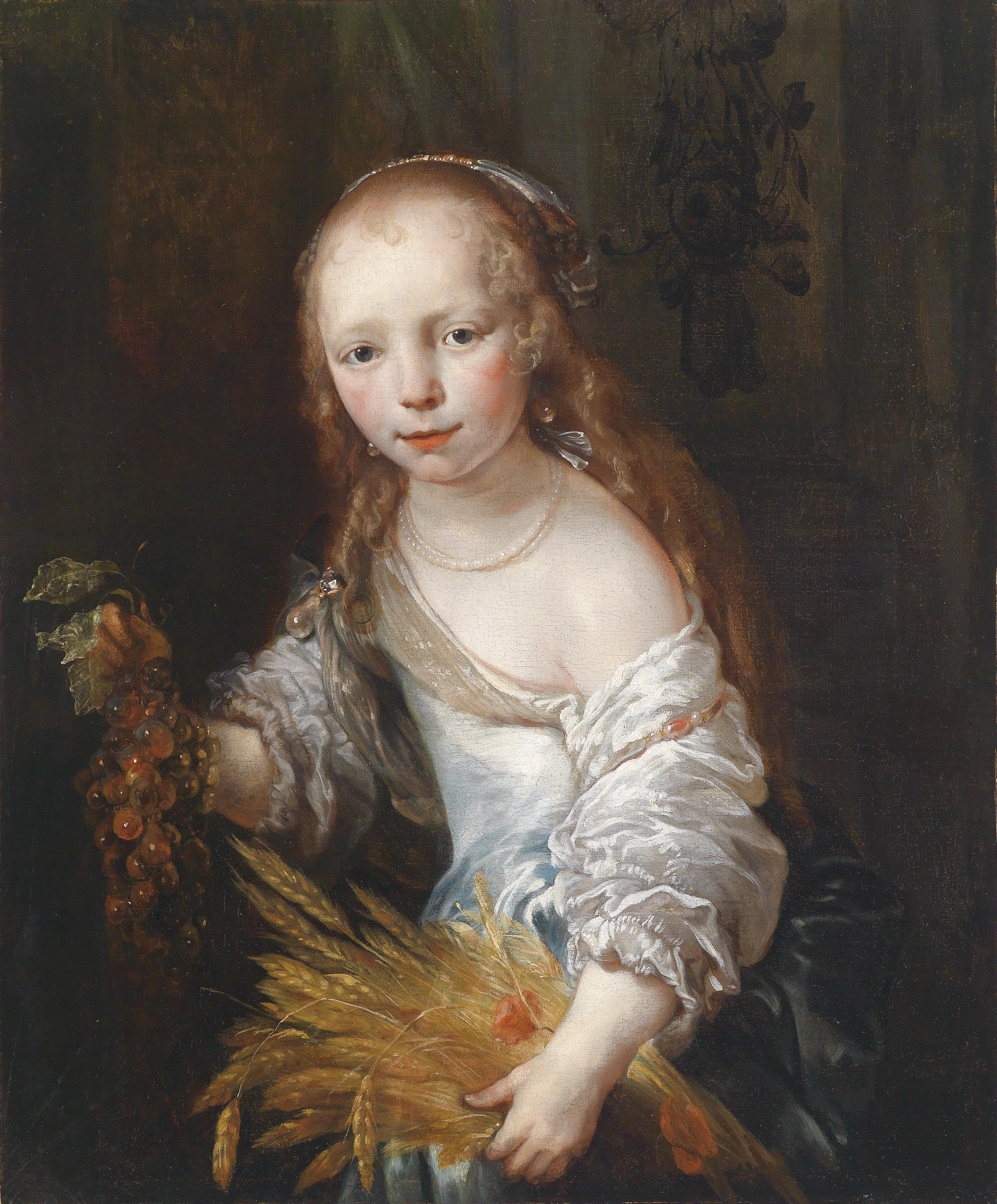
Portrait of a young girl as Ceres, MNHA Luxembourg

Jan van Noordt (1623/24, Schagen – after 1676, Amsterdam?) was a Dutch Golden Age painter.

== Biography ==
Jan (Joan, Johannes) van Noordt was one of four sons of the schoolteacher and carillonneur Sibrand van Noordt. The family hailed from the North Holland town of Schagen, where Jan was born in 1623 or 1624, and moved to Amsterdam in the late 1630s, taking a house on the Rusland. Jan's brothers Jacobus and Anthonie became the most prominent organists in the city, gaining posts in various churches, including the Oude Kerk and the Nieuwezijds Kapel. Jan appears already to have started training in Amsterdam well before 1640, under Jacob Adriaensz. Backer, as he contributed to paintings from that year such as Jesus and the Samaritan Woman in Middelburg, and David and Bathsheba in a private collection in Tokyo. Jan studied alongside Abraham van den Tempel and would remain friends with him and his brother Jacob, a textile merchant.

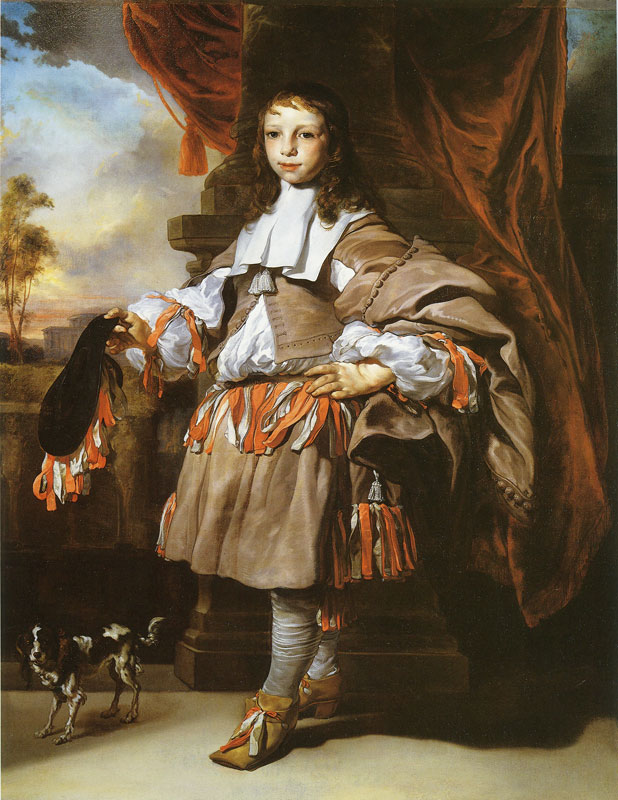
Jan van Noordt, Portrait of a Young Man with his Dog, 1665. Oil on canvas, 154 × 121 cm, Lyon, Musée des beaux-arts de Lyon (inv. no. B577).

As an independent artist Van Noordt turned his attention to genre themes, especially the pastoral scenes that had become fashionable in Dutch art. In the late 1650s he started to draw portrait patronage, and this evidently allowed him to return to history painting. In the course of the 1660s his style shifted from the dynamic elegance studied from Backer to a ripe and robust style drawing mainly on the Flemish painter Jacob Jordaens, who had recently carried out major commissions in Amsterdam. He drew a commission for portraits from Jan Jacobsz. Hinlopen and Leonora Huydecoper. During these years he taught Johannes Voorhout, among other artists. His production declined after 1672, owing to the general economic downturn in the wake of the Triple Invasion of 1672. He remained a bachelor, and was sharing quarters with his brother Anthonie in 1670. In 1674 he gave his address as the Bloemgracht in the Jordaan district of Amsterdam in 1674, and gave up a small studio nearby on the Egelantiersgracht in 1675. A signed and dated Rest on the Flight into Egypt of 1676 is the last recorded trace of him.

== Oeuvre ==
Van Noordt likely contributed to production in Backer's busy workshop in the late 1630s, and the earliest signs of his hand is in background figures in Backer's Christ and the Samaritan Woman of 1640s in Middelburg. Not much later he produced a large Triumph of David, in which Backer's influence is strongly evident.
