= Haruka Orth =

American actress

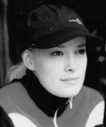
- Born: Ilonka Orth; November 16, 1982 (age 43); Chicago, U.S.
- Height: 169 cm (5 ft 7 in)

Ilonka Haruka Tatianna Orth (born in Chicago, USA, November 16, 1982) is a Hungarian-American actress, director, and astrologer who lives in Kichijōji, Tokyo, Japan. She is a graduate of International Christian University in Mitaka, Tokyo, Japan and currently works for the production agency R&A Promotion.

Fluent in Japanese, Orth is most known for her appearances on the Akashiya Sanma hosted variety program Koi no Karasawagi, her portrayal of the villain Marlene in the cult film Siberian Express 5, and her frequent participation in the program Waratte Iitomo!. She also gained notability for being the first non-Japanese to be featured in the long-running Saturday Wide Theatre, and was featured in newspapers across the country.

Orth performs in a variety of vaudeville-style television shows, often introducing Hungarian food, customs and culture.

== Theatre work ==
Orth is involved in Japanese theatre industry, translating foreign plays into Japanese and vice versa, writing scripts, working in production, and participating as an actor in plays as well, when the script calls for a gaikokujin. She also writes theatre reviews for Gekijo Magazine, and directs for Green Theatre in Ikebukuro.

She also is currently a reporter on the NHK program Journeys in Japan.

== Filmography ==
=== Movies ===
- Godzilla: Final Wars (2004)
- Baruto no Gakuen (2005)
- The Uchōten Hotel (2006)
- Suite Dreams (2006) as Marilyn Monroe
- Heat Island (2007)
- Tooku no Sora ni Kieta (2007)

=== Television drama ===
- Haruka Seventeen (????)
- Boku no Maho Tsukai (2003)
- Hagetaka (2007)
- Sandaime no Yome (2008)
- Seigi no Mikata (2008)
- Atsuhime (2008), Margaret Watson Borradail

=== Theatre ===
- Kuroi Ame Ikegami Honmoji
- Ecstasy Naka-Meguro Rakuka
- Innerchild: Amenokuni Gonza Jiji Tsushin Hall
- Sono Oku He Geshihite Shimo Kitazawa Kuukan Liberty
- Teens Blues Naka-Meguro Woody Theatre
