= Joël van Noort =

Dutch speedcuber

Joël van Noort is a Dutch speedcuber (solving the Rubik's Cube as fast as possible). Joël is one of the top cubers and has won many tournaments. His most memorable win was at the European Championship in 2006 in Paris. Further tournaments victories were: Dutch Nationals 2005, German Open 2006, Belgian Open 2006, Dutch Open 2006, German Open 2007 and Dutch Open 2007. Joël finished 6th at the 2007 World Championship in Budapest. He has held several Dutch and European Records.
