= Orde (surname) =

Orde is a surname. Notable people with the surname include:

- Cuthbert Orde (1888–1968), British war artist
- Hugh Orde (born 1958), senior British police officer
- Julian Orde (1917–1974), female English poet, writer and actor
- Sir John Orde, 1st Baronet (1751–1824), British Royal Navy officer
