= Schloss Ort =

Castle in Austria

Coordinates: 47°54′42″N 13°47′32″E

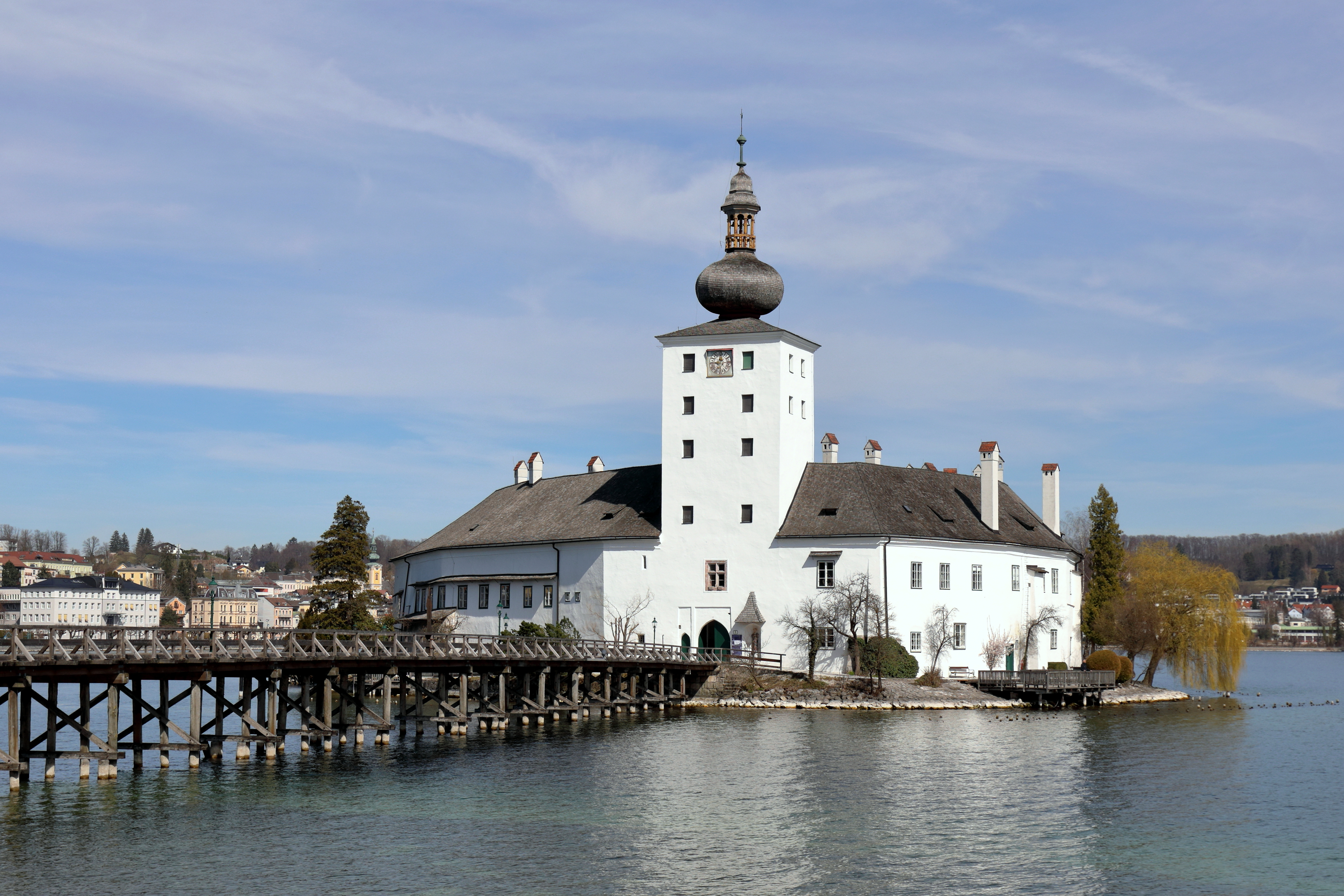
Schloss Ort

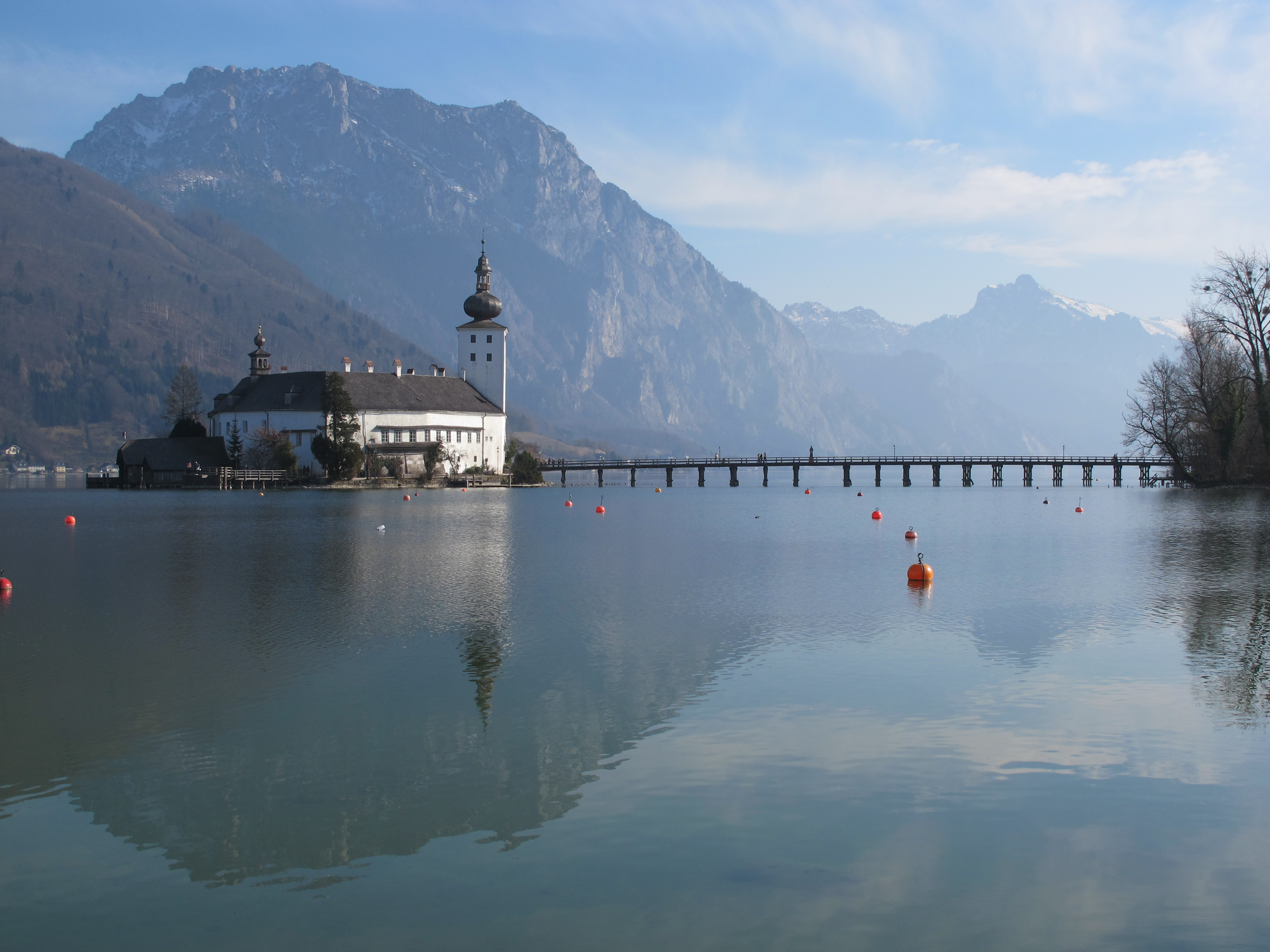
Schloss Ort with Erlakogel in the background

Schloss Ort (or Schloss Orth) is an Austrian castle situated in the Traunsee lake, in Gmunden, 19 kilometres (12 mi) from Vöcklabruck, the gate to Salzkammergut.

== Early history ==
The castle was founded around 1080 by Hartnidus of Ort, and improvements continued to be made into the thirteenth century - for example by Hartnidus V in 1244. In 1344 the brothers Friedrich and Reinprecht I of Wallsee purchased the castle, which became Friedrich’s sole possession on January 25, 1350. The castle remained in the possession of the Wallsee family until 1483, when Schloss Ort passed to Frederick III, Holy Roman Emperor.

== 1484–1689 ==
Schloss Ort as drawn in 1594

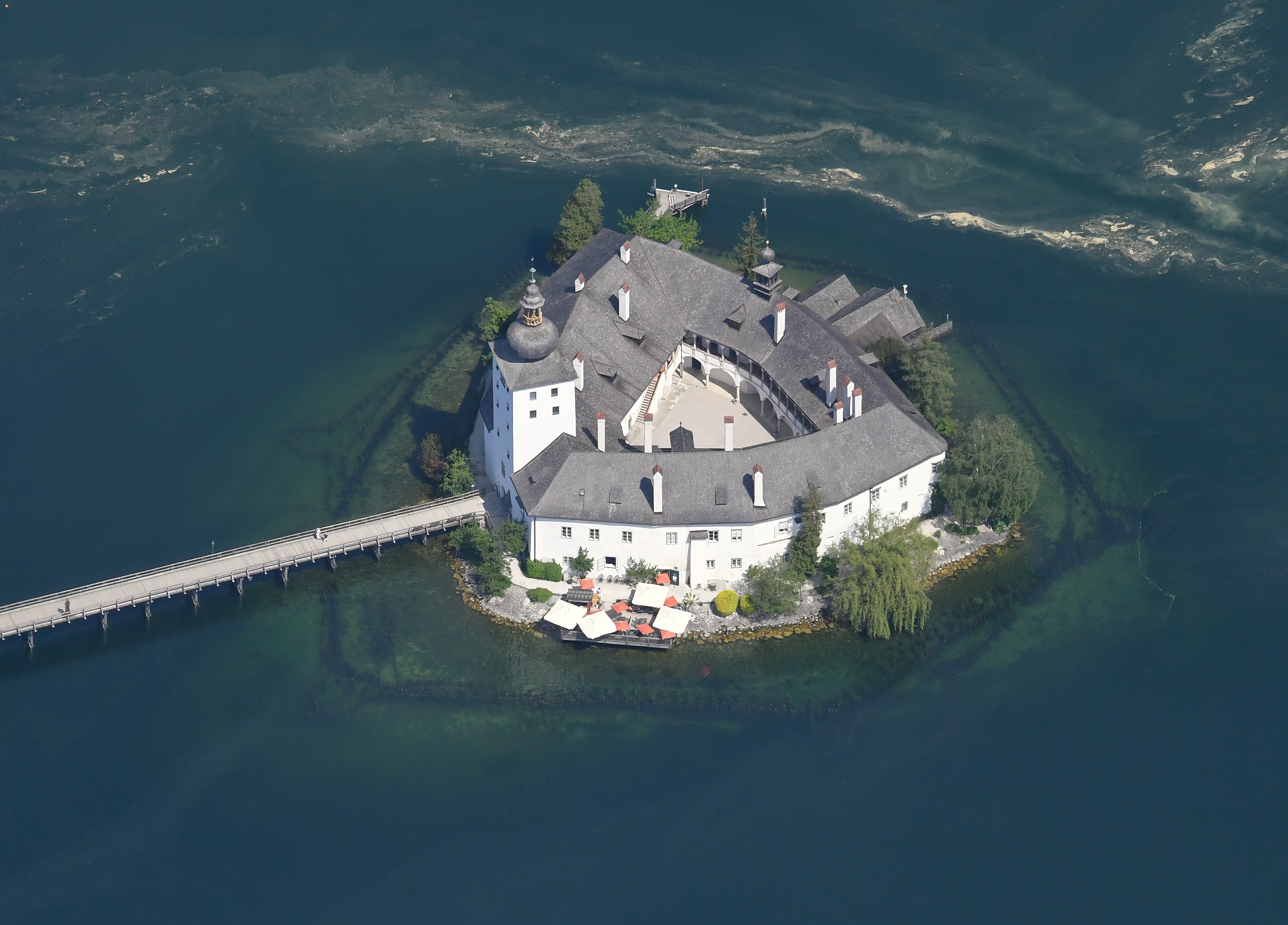
Aerial view of Schloss Ort

From 1484 to 1491, the castle was governed by Gotthard von Starhenberg, the Governor of Upper Austria. In 1492, Bernhard of Starhenberg and later his descendants ruled the castle until 1584. In 1588, the castle was purchased by Weikhard Freiherr of Pollheim, but he sold the castle on April 6, 1595 to the city of Gmunden. However, Gmunden sold the castle to Rudolf II that same year. The castle then passed to other owners before finally being acquired by Leopold I, Holy Roman Emperor.

== Modern era ==
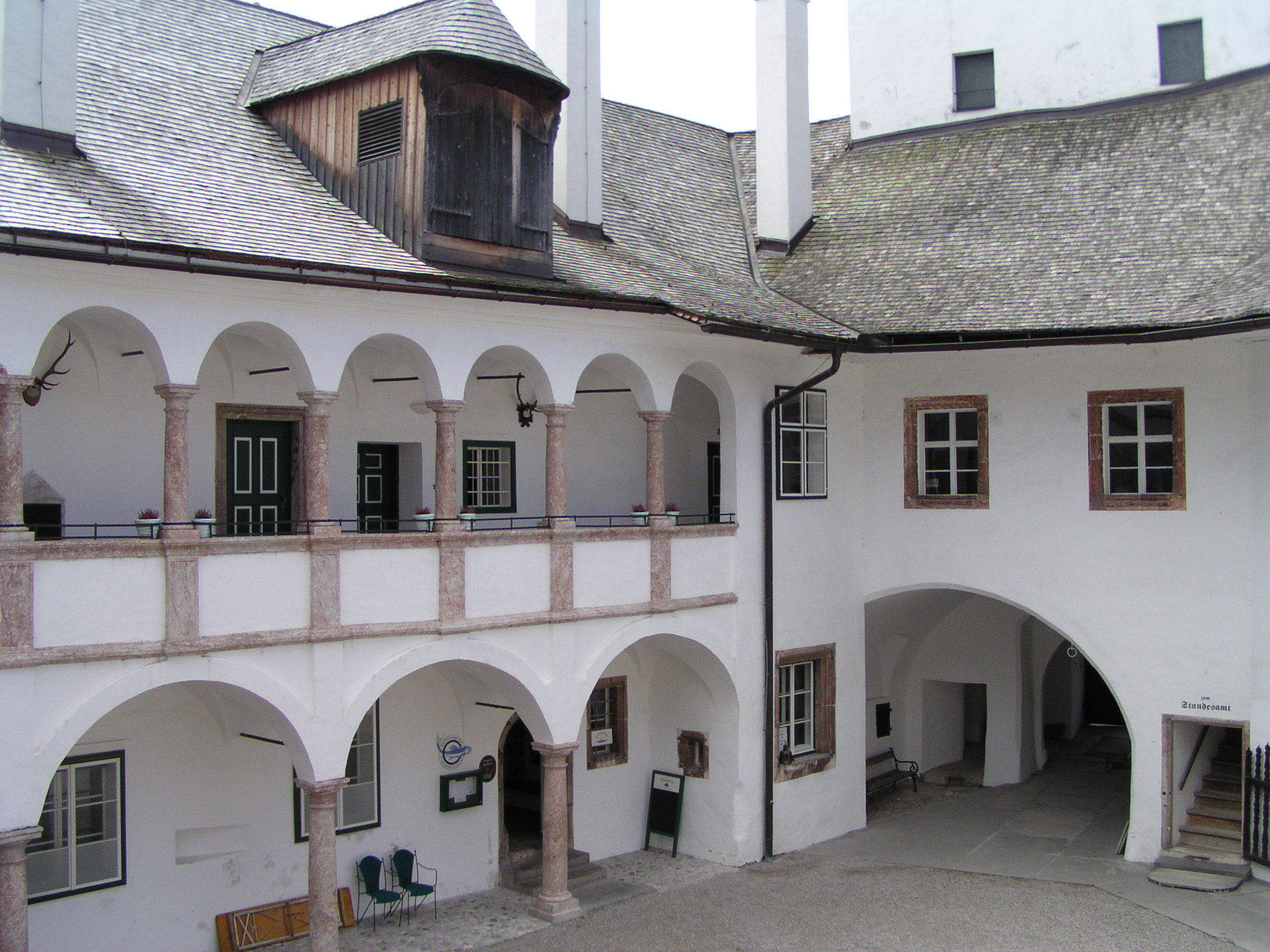
Inner courtyard

In 1876, the castle was one of five estates in Gmunden acquired by Archduke Johann Salvator of Austria (John of Tuscany) (1852 – ca. 1911), the tenth and last child of Grand Duke Leopold II of Tuscany and Maria Antonietta of the Two Sicilies, but on October 6, 1889 he renounced his title and connections to the Habsburg imperial house, changed his name to Johann Orth. and in 1890 departed for South America with his morganatic wife on his own ship, the St. Margaret. Johann Nepomuk Salvator was presumed lost at sea in 1890, and declared dead in 1911, but his actual date of death is unknown.

In October and November of 1912, the Habsburgs auctioned off the property and possessions of Johann Salvator, including the Schloss Ort estate. Franz Mayerhofer, the majordomo of Schloss Ort since entrusted by Orth in 1890, died reportedly of a broken heart early in proceedings. The castle was acquired by Franz Joseph I of Austria in 1914, and it was intended for students of Gmunden’s schools to be allowed to visit the castle, but this plan was interrupted by World War I.

The castle was not well maintained between 1919 and 1973.

At present the castle is being used for a study center of the Federal Ministry for Land and Forestry (Bundesministeriums für Land- und Forstwirtschaft). On January 5, 1995, the castle was officially acquired by the city of Gmunden. In 1996, it began to be used as a location for the TV series Schlosshotel Orth.
