= Ort (surname) =

Ort' is a surname, and may refer to:

- Bastiaan Ort, Dutch lawyer, judge and politician
- Donald R. Ort, American botanist and biochemist
- Kaleb Ort (born 1992), American baseball player

== See also ==
- Oort (surname)
