= Lambert van Noort =

Flemish painter

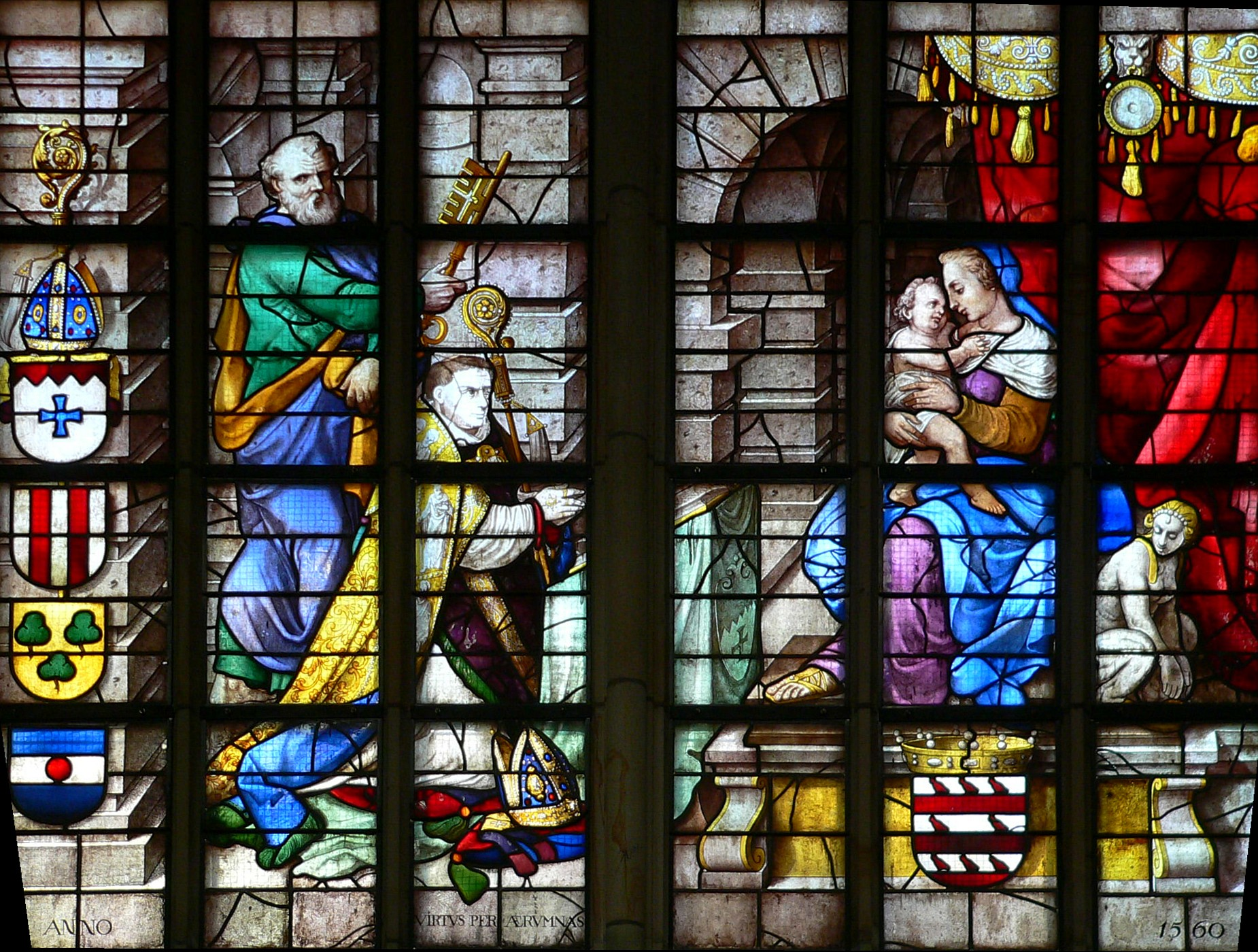
Detail of Glass 13 in the Janskerk, Gouda with a portrait of the donor Petrus van Zuyren on the left

Lambert van Noort (1520–1571) was a Flemish Renaissance painter.

== Biography ==
Lambert was born in Amersfoort. According to Houbraken he was an important painter and architect who became the father of the painter Adam van Noort. In 1547 he became a member of the Antwerp Guild of St. Luke. Houbraken took his information from Karel van Mander, who called him Lambrecht van Oort.

According to the RKD, van Noort was a painter in oils as well as a draughtsman of stained glass window designs. He died in Antwerp.
