= Adam van Noort =

Flemish painter

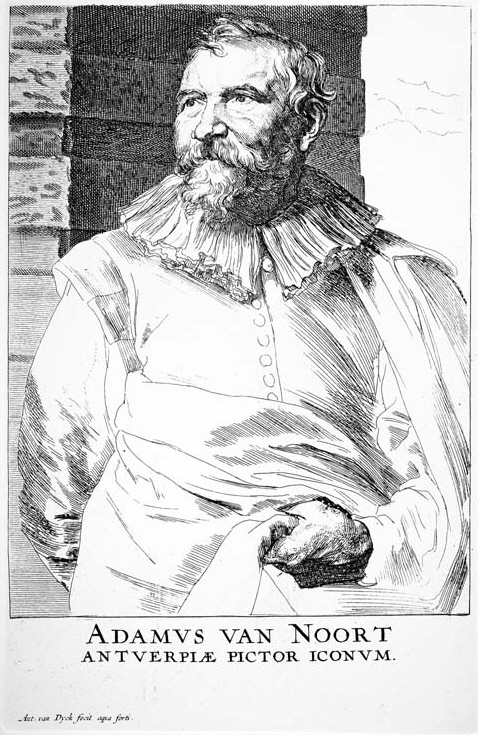
Adam van Noort by Anthony van Dyck

Adam van Noort (1561/62–1641) was a Flemish painter and draughtsman and one of the teachers of Peter Paul Rubens and the only teacher of Jacob Jordaens. Adam van Noort was mainly known for his history paintings but he also created some portraits. He was a designer for engravings for the Collaert family of printmakers and publishers.

== Life ==
Adam van Noort was born and died in Antwerp. He was the son of Lambert van Noort from Amersfoort and Katelijne van Broeckhuysen from Zwolle. His parents had established themselves in Antwerp, where Lambert became a member of the local Guild of Saint Luke in 1549. His father was active primarily as a designer of stained-glass windows and engravings, an architect, and, to a lesser extent, a painter. The family lived in poverty.

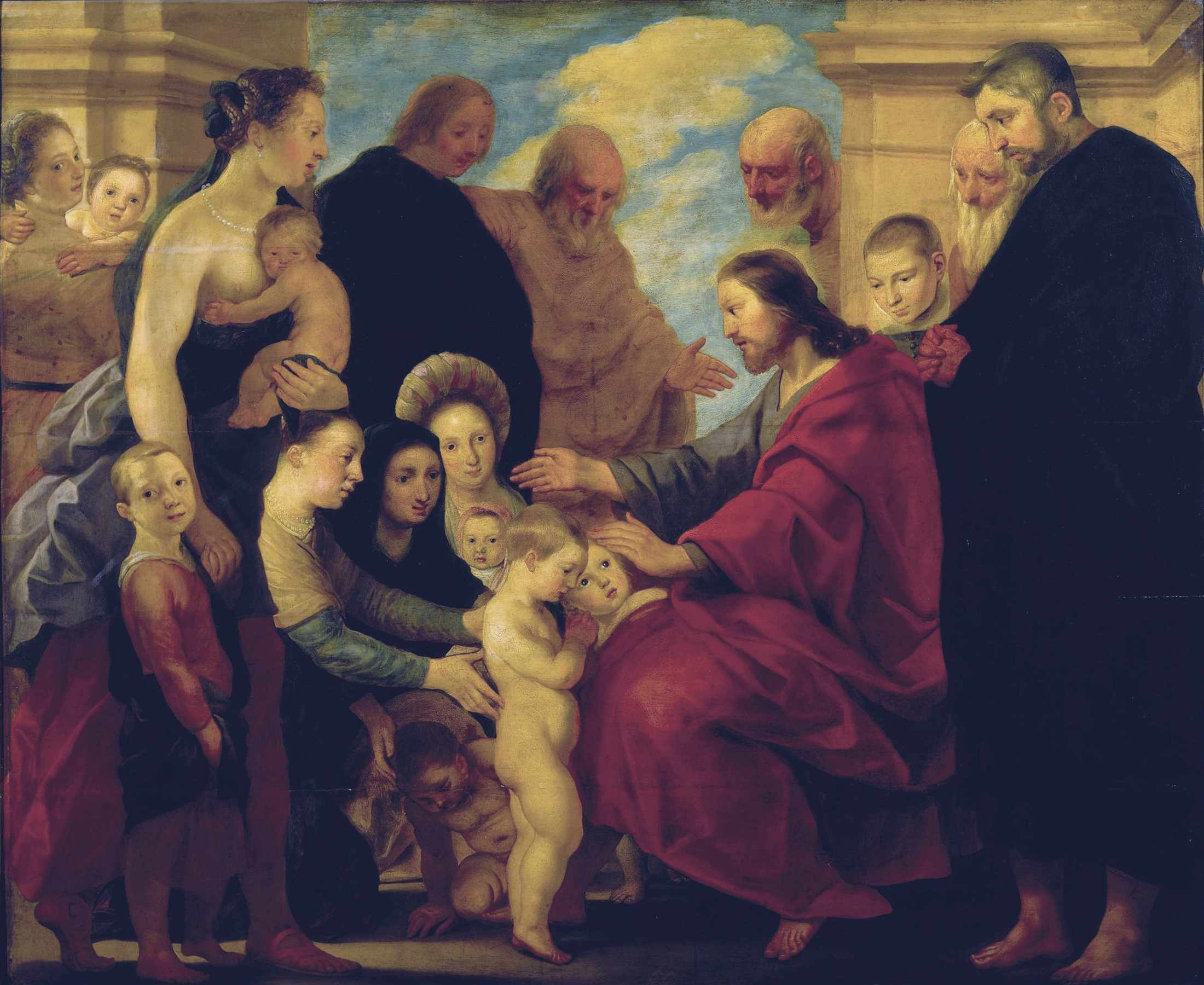
Let the children come to me

Adam van Noort probably initially trained with his father but must have had other teachers since his father died when he was still young. He was not registered with any other teacher in the records of the Guild of Saint Luke. He became a master of the Guild of Saint Luke in 1587. He married Elisabeth Nuyts, with whom he had five children.

Van Noort served as dean of the Guild of Saint Luke from 1597 until 1602. He had problems with the Guild, which accused him of poor management of the accounts and misappropriation of materials of the Guild. The first conflict arose when van Noort used some unpainted panels in the Painter's Chamber of the Guild to create a composition he wanted to give as a present to the Guild in remembrance of his service as a deacon. Some other guild members objected to his actions, and he was forced to substitute the panels and to ensure that they were painted within a year with a design approved by the Guild. The commission to paint the substituted panels did finally not go to van Noort but to Maerten de Vos. A second conflict with the Guild arose from the fact that he did not settle his accounts in time after he ceased being a deacon of the Guild.

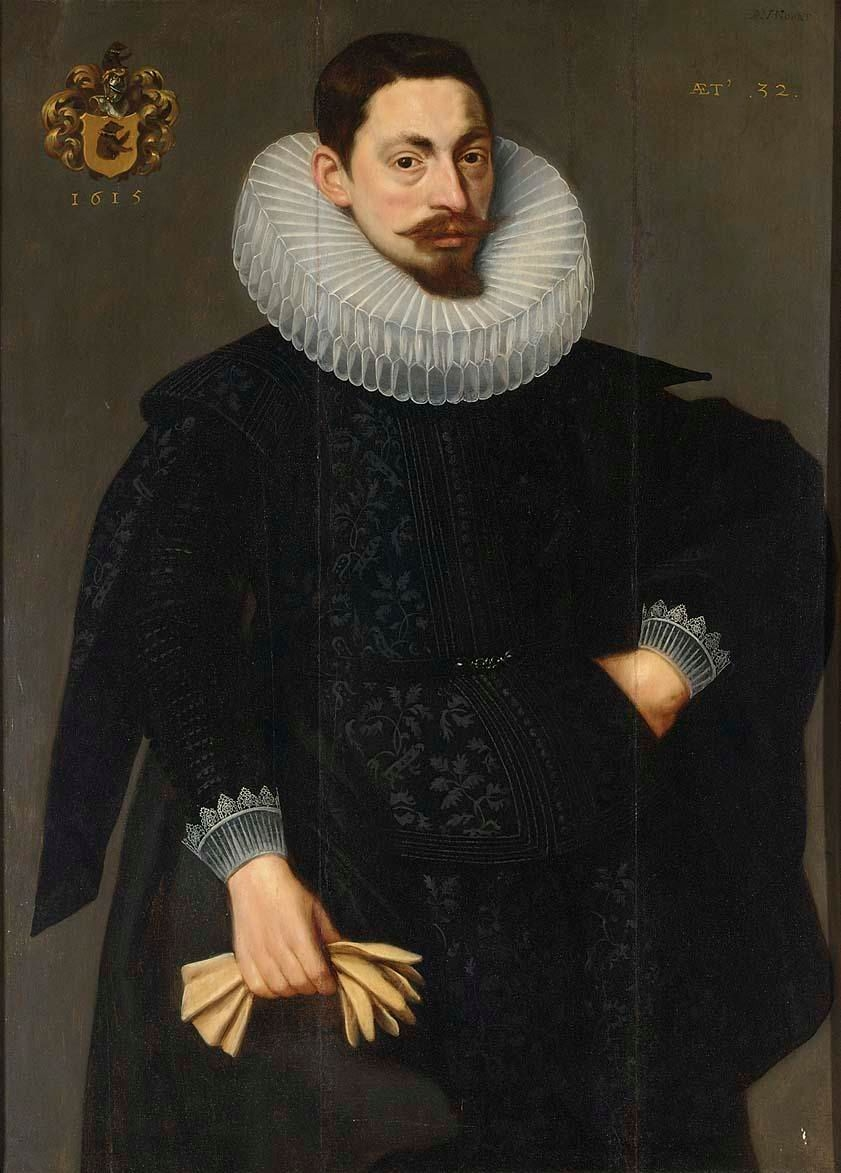
Portrait of a bearded man

Adam's present-day fame largely rests on the fact that he was the teacher of two of the leading Flemish Baroque painters, Peter Paul Rubens and Jacob Jordaens. Rubens only stayed for a little over a year and is not believed to have been influenced much by van Noort's training. Jordaens married van Noort's daughter, Elisabeth, and would influence the style of his teacher and father-in-law. The total number of pupils of van Noort was around 35. This attests to the fact that in his time he was a very respected artist. He was also financially successful and was able to acquire several properties in Antwerp.

The other pupils of Adam van Noort include Hendrick van Balen, Ferdinand van Apshoven the Elder, Artus de Bruyn, Hendrik van der Eedt, Remoldus Eynhoudt and Hendrick van Herp.

Van Noort lived to an old age but likely ceased practising as an artist around 1630. He made his last will on 31 August 1640 and died not long after September that year.

== Work ==
Van Noort painted mainly paintings of religious subjects and portraits. He collaborated with Marten de Vos and Ambrosius Francken on the decorations for the Joyous Entry of Archduke Ernest of Austria in 1594. Originally working in the Mannerist style of the aforementioned two artists, he developed his own style which was a transformation of Frans Floris’ Romanism executed on a smaller scale (such as in The preaching of John the Baptist, 1601). The Last Supper, a collaboration with Willem Key, is another good example of his style with its strong movement within a diagonal composition.

Later, with the arrival in his workshop and under the influence of Jacob Jordaens, he adopted some of the dynamism and monumentality of the Baroque into his work. This influence is evident in his Let the children come to me (c. 1609–10,Royal Museums of Fine Arts of Belgium).
