= List of fellows of the Royal Society elected in 1959 =

This is a list of people elected Fellow of the Royal Society in 1959.

== Royal Fellow ==
- Gustaf VI Adolf of Sweden

== Fellows ==
- Geoffrey Herbert Beale
- Franz Bergel
- Ann Bishop
- Geoffrey Emett Blackman
- Sir Hermann Bondi
- James Macdonald Cassels
- Arthur Roy Clapham
- Francis Harry Compton Crick
- Geoffrey Bertram Robert Feilden
- Raymond James Wood Le Fevre
- David Willis Wilson Henderson
- Richard Darwin Keynes
- Bernhard Hermann Neumann
- Stephen Robert Nockolds
- William Charles Price
- Geoffrey Vincent Raynor
- Sir Rex Edward Richards
- Owain Westmacott Richards
- Claude Ambrose Rogers
- Muhammad Abdus Salam
- Robert Spence
- Sylvia Agnes Sophia Tait
- James Francis Tait
- Maurice Hugh Frederick Wilkins
- Sidney William Wooldridge

== Foreign members ==
- Melvin Calvin
- Gerhard Domagk
- Jan Hendrik Oort
- Axel Hugo Theodor Theorell
