= Hipparcos =

European Space Agency scientific satellite

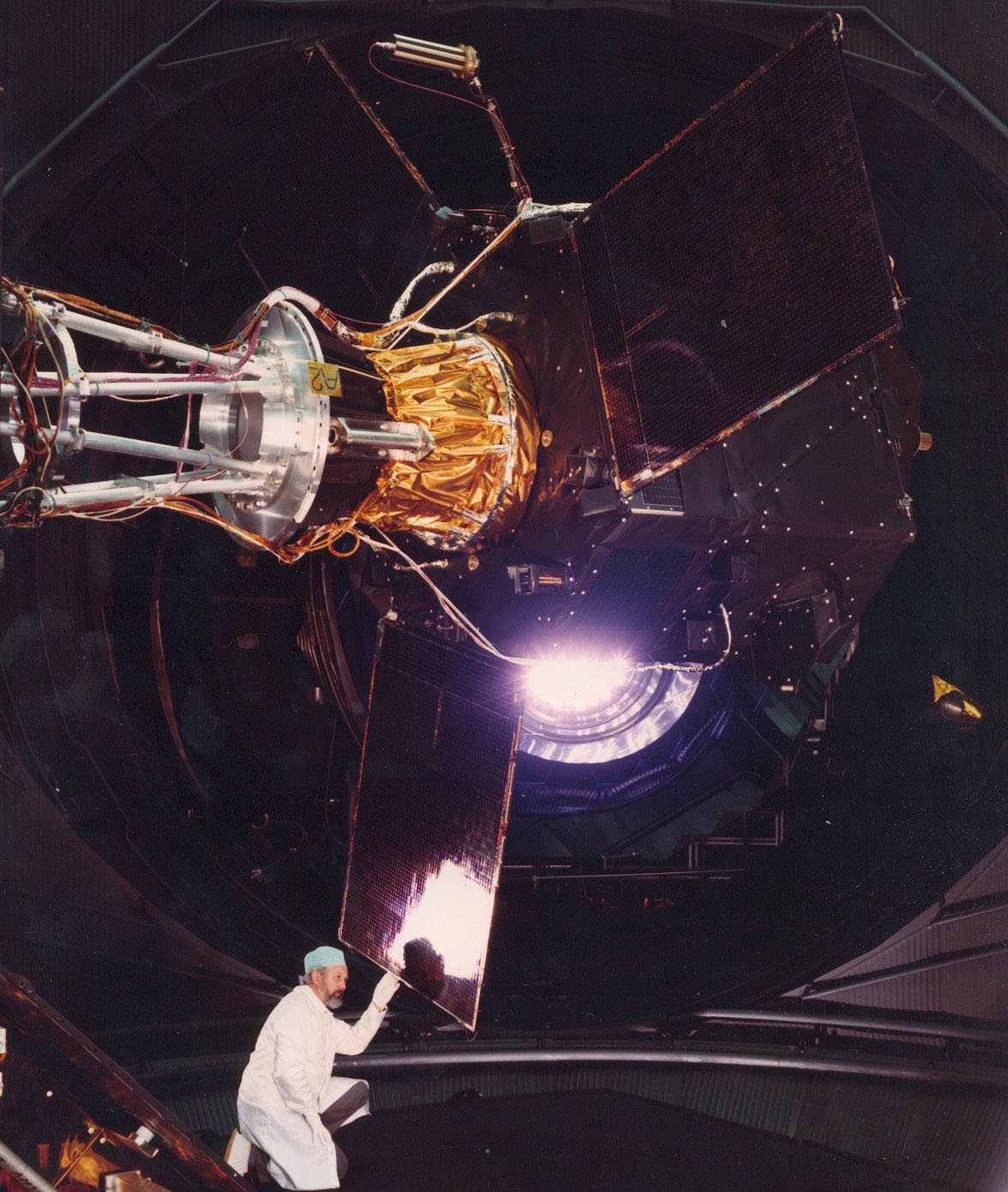
- Hipparcos satellite in the Large Solar Simulator, ESTEC, February 1988
- Names: HIPPARCOS
- Mission type: Astrometric observatory
- Operator: ESA
- COSPAR ID: 1989-062B
- SATCAT no.: 20169
- Website: http://sci.esa.int/hipparcos/
- Mission duration: 2.5 years (planned); 4 years (achieved)

Spacecraft properties
- Spacecraft: HIPPARCOS
- Manufacturer: Alenia Spazio; Matra Marconi Space
- Launch mass: 1,140 kg (2,510 lb)
- Dry mass: 635 kg (1,400 lb)
- Payload mass: 210 kg (460 lb)
- Power: 295 watts

Start of mission
- Launch date: 8 August 1989, 23:25:53 UTC
- Rocket: Ariane 44LP H10 (V33)
- Launch site: Centre Spatial Guyanais, Kourou, ELA-2
- Contractor: Arianespace
- Entered service: August 1989

End of mission
- Disposal: decommissioned
- Deactivated: August 1993

Orbital parameters
- Reference system: Geocentric orbit
- Regime: Geostationary transfer orbit Geostationary orbit (planned)
- Perigee altitude: 500.3 km (310.9 mi)
- Apogee altitude: 35,797.5 km (22,243.5 mi)
- Inclination: 6.84°
- Period: 636.9 minutes
- Revolution no.: 17830

Main telescope
- Type: Schmidt telescope
- Diameter: 29 cm (11 in)
- Focal length: 1.4 m (4 ft 7 in)
- Wavelengths: visible light

Transponders
- Band: S-Band
- Bandwidth: 2-23 kbit/s
- Legacy ESA insignia (2020s)

Hipparcos was a scientific satellite of the European Space Agency (ESA), launched in 1989 and operated until 1993. It was the first space experiment devoted to precision astrometry, the accurate measurement of the positions and distances of celestial objects on the sky. This was the first practical attempt at all-sky absolute parallax measurement, something not possible with groundside observatories, and thus represented a fundamental breakthrough in astronomy. The resulting high-precision measurements of the absolute positions, proper motions, and parallaxes of stars enabled better calculations of their distance and tangential velocity; when combined with radial velocity measurements from spectroscopy, astrophysicists were able to finally measure all six quantities needed to determine the motion of stars. The resulting Hipparcos Catalogue, a high-precision catalogue of more than 118,200 stars, was published in 1997. The lower-precision Tycho Catalogue of more than a million stars was published at the same time, while the enhanced Tycho-2 Catalogue of 2.5 million stars was published in 2000. Hipparcos's follow-up mission, Gaia, was launched in 2013.

The word "Hipparcos" is an acronym for High Precision Parallax Collecting Satellite and also a reference to the ancient Greek astronomer Hipparchus of Nicaea, who is noted for applications of trigonometry to astronomy and his discovery of the precession of the equinoxes.

== Background ==
By the second half of the 20th century, the accurate measurement of star positions from the ground was running into essentially insurmountable barriers to improvements in accuracy, especially for large-angle measurements and systematic terms. Problems were dominated by the effects of the Earth's atmosphere, but were compounded by complex optical terms, thermal and gravitational instrument flexures, and the absence of all-sky visibility. A formal proposal to make these exacting observations from space was first put forward in 1967.

Even other space telescopes including (but not limited to) Hubble, are only capable of measuring relative astrometry, measuring positions and parallaxes by reference to nearby background stars/sources. Compiling a variety of such local, relative parallaxes results in regional errors, making distance comparisons between distant sky regions quite difficult. Hipparcos was the first project to engage in absolute astrometry: in addition to being an all-sky survey, Hipparcos introduced the concept of using two telescopes, separated by a wide "basic" angle, being directed onto a single focal plane. As a result, all measurements made by either telescope are connected to simultaneous measurements by the other. With a variety of transit angles on each individual source, it then becomes connected to many other parts of the sky. The final data reduction can then use these myriad distant sky connections to deduce a single global rigid reference frame by which to anchor all position/parallax measurements. (This is somewhat similar to how Earth coordinate systems were anchored by a global network of triangles.)

The mission was originally proposed to the French space agency CNES, which considered it too complex and expensive for a single national programme and recommended that it be proposed in a multinational context. Its acceptance within the European Space Agency's scientific programme, in 1980, was the result of a lengthy process of study and lobbying. The underlying scientific motivation was to determine the physical properties of the stars through the measurement of their distances and space motions, and thus to place theoretical studies of stellar structure and evolution, and studies of galactic structure and kinematics, on a more secure empirical basis. Observationally, the objective was to provide the positions, parallaxes, and annual proper motions for some 100,000 stars with an unprecedented accuracy of 0.002 arcseconds, a target in practice eventually surpassed by a factor of two. The name of the space telescope, "Hipparcos", was an acronym for High Precision Parallax Collecting Satellite, and it also reflected the name of the ancient Greek astronomer Hipparchus, who is considered the founder of trigonometry and the discoverer of the precession of the equinoxes (due to the Earth wobbling on its axis).

== Satellite and payload ==
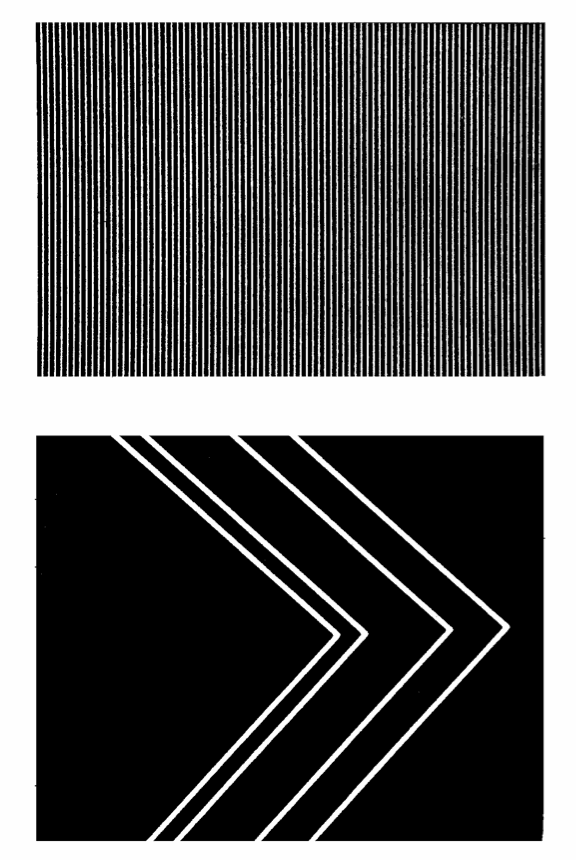
Optical micrograph of part of the main modulating grid (top) and the star mapper grid (bottom). The period of the main grid is 8.2 micrometres.

The spacecraft carried a single all-reflective, eccentric Schmidt telescope, with an aperture of 29 cm (11 in). A special beam-combining mirror superimposed two fields of view, 58° apart, into the common focal plane. This complex mirror consisted of two mirrors tilted in opposite directions, each occupying half of the rectangular entrance pupil, and providing an unvignetted field of view of about 1° × 1°. The telescope used a system of grids, at the focal surface, composed of 2688 alternate opaque and transparent bands, with a period of 1.208 arc-sec (8.2 micrometre). Behind this grid system, an image dissector tube (photomultiplier type detector) with a sensitive field of view of about 38-arc-sec diameter converted the modulated light into a sequence of photon counts (with a sampling frequency of 1200 Hz) from which the phase of the entire pulse train from a star could be derived. The apparent angle between two stars in the combined fields of view, modulo the grid period, was obtained from the phase difference of the two star pulse trains. Originally targeting the observation of some 100,000 stars, with an astrometric accuracy of about 0.002 arc-sec, the final Hipparcos Catalogue comprised nearly 120,000 stars with a median accuracy of slightly better than 0.001 arc-sec (1 milliarc-sec).

An additional photomultiplier system viewed a beam splitter in the optical path and was used as a star mapper. Its purpose was to monitor and determine the satellite attitude, and in the process, to gather photometric and astrometric data of all stars down to about 11th magnitude. These measurements were made in two broad bands approximately corresponding to B and V in the (Johnson) UBV photometric system. The positions of these latter stars were to be determined to a precision of 0.03 arc-sec, which is a factor of 25 less than the main mission stars. Originally targeting the observation of around 400,000 stars, the resulting Tycho Catalogue comprised just over 1 million stars, with a subsequent analysis extending this to the Tycho-2 Catalogue of about 2.5 million stars.

The attitude of the spacecraft about its center of gravity was controlled to scan the celestial sphere in a regular precessional motion maintaining a constant inclination between the spin axis and the direction to the Sun. The spacecraft spun around its Z-axis at the rate of 11.25 revolutions/day (168.75 arc-sec/s) at an angle of 43° to the Sun. The Z-axis rotated about the Sun-satellite line at 6.4 revolutions/year.

The spacecraft consisted of two platforms and six vertical panels, all made of aluminum honeycomb. The solar array consisted of three deployable sections, generating around 300 W in total. Two S-band antennas were located on the top and bottom of the spacecraft, providing an omni-directional downlink data rate of 24 kbit/s. An attitude and orbit-control subsystem (comprising 5-newton hydrazine thrusters for course manoeuvres, 20-millinewton cold gas thrusters for attitude control, and gyroscopes for attitude determination) ensured correct dynamic attitude control and determination during the operational lifetime.

== Principles ==
Some key features of the observations were as follows:

- through observations from space, the effects of astronomical seeing due to the atmosphere, instrumental gravitational flexure and thermal distortions could be obviated or minimised;
- all-sky visibility permitted a direct linking of the stars observed all over the celestial sphere;
- the two viewing directions of the satellite, separated by a large and suitable angle (58°), resulted in a rigid connection between quasi-instantaneous one-dimensional observations in different parts of the sky. In turn, this led to parallax determinations which are absolute (rather than relative, with respect to some unknown zero-point);
- the continuous ecliptic-based scanning of the satellite resulted in an optimum use of the available observing time, with a resulting catalogue providing reasonably homogeneous sky density and uniform astrometric accuracy over the entire celestial sphere;

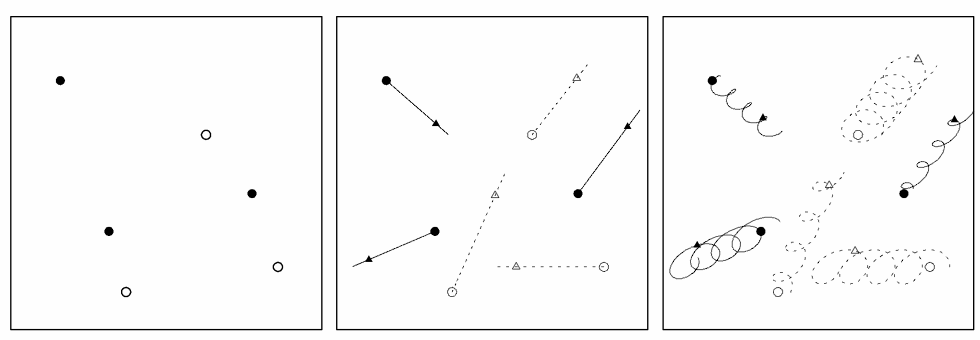
Principles of the astrometric measurements. Filled circles and solid lines show three objects from one field of view (about 1° in size), and open circles and dashed lines show three objects from a distinct sky region superimposed by virtue of the large basic angle. Left: object positions at one reference epoch. Middle: their space motions over about four years, with arbitrary proper motion vectors and scale factors; triangles show their positions at a fixed epoch near the end of the interval. Right: the total positional changes including the additional apparent motions due to annual parallax, the four loops corresponding to four Earth orbits around the sun. The parallax-induced motions are in phase for all stars in the same region of sky, so that relative measurements within one field can provide only relative parallaxes. Although the relative separations between the stars change continuously over the measurement period, they are described by just five numerical parameters per star (two components of position, two of proper motion, and the parallax).

- the various geometrical scan configurations for each star, at multiple epochs throughout the 3-year observation programme, resulted in a dense network of one-dimensional positions from which the barycentric coordinate direction, the parallax, and the object's proper motion, could be solved for in what was effectively a global least squares reduction of the totality of observations. The astrometric parameters as well as their standard errors and correlation coefficients were derived in the process;
- since the number of independent geometrical observations per object was large (typically of order 30) compared with the number of unknowns for the standard model (five astrometric unknowns per star), astrometric solutions not complying with this simple five-parameter model could be expanded to take into account the effects of double or multiple stars, or non-linear photocentric motions ascribed to unresolved astrometric binaries;
- a somewhat larger number of actual observations per object, of order 110, provided accurate and homogeneous photometric information for each star, from which mean magnitudes, variability amplitudes, and in many cases period and variability type classification could be undertaken.

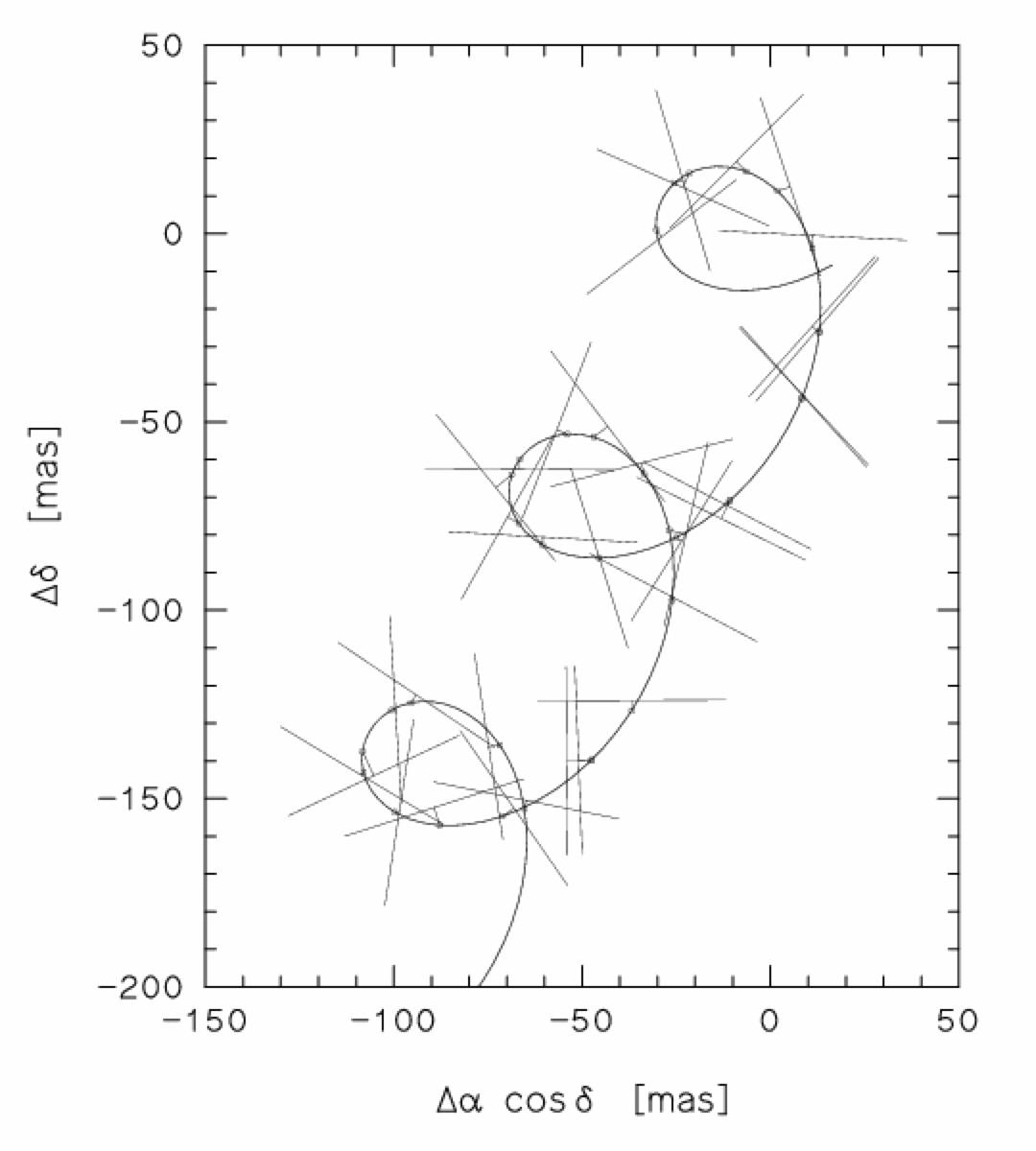
The path on the sky of one of the Hipparcos Catalogue objects, over a period of three years. Each straight line indicates the observed position of the star at a particular epoch: because the measurement is one-dimensional, the precise location along this position line is undetermined by the observation. The curve is the modelled stellar path fitted to all the measurements. The inferred position at each epoch is indicated by a dot, and the residual by a short line joining the dot to the corresponding position line. The amplitude of the oscillatory motion gives the star's parallax, with the linear component representing the star's proper motion.

== Development, launch and operations ==
The Hipparcos satellite was financed and managed under the overall authority of the European Space Agency (ESA). The main industrial contractors were Matra Marconi Space (now EADS Astrium) and Alenia Spazio (now Thales Alenia Space).

Other hardware components were supplied as follows:

- the beam-combining mirror by REOSC in Saint-Pierre-du-Perray, France
- the spherical, folding, and relay mirrors by Carl Zeiss AG in Oberkochen, Germany
- the external straylight baffles by CASA in Madrid, Spain
- the modulating grid by CSEM in Neuchâtel, Switzerland
- the mechanism control system and the thermal control electronics by Dornier Satellite Systems in Friedrichshafen, Germany
- the optical filters, the experiment structures and the attitude and orbit control system by Matra Marconi Space in Vélizy, France
- the instrument switching mechanisms by Oerlikon-Contraves in Zürich, Switzerland
- the image dissector tube and photomultiplier detectors by the Dutch Space Research Organisation (SRON) in the Netherlands
- the refocusing assembly mechanism by TNO-TPD in Delft, Netherlands
- the electrical power subsystem by British Aerospace in Bristol, United Kingdom
- the structure and reaction control system by Daimler-Benz Aerospace in Bremen, Germany
- the solar arrays and thermal control system by Fokker Space System in Leiden, Netherlands
- the data handling and telecommunications system by Saab Ericsson Space in Gothenburg, Sweden
- the apogee kick motor by SEP in France

Groups from the Institut d'Astrophysique in Liège, Belgium and the Laboratoire d'Astronomie Spatiale in Marseille, France, contributed optical performance, calibration, and alignment test procedures; Captec in Dublin, Ireland, and Logica in London contributed to the on-board software and calibration.

The Hipparcos satellite was launched (with the direct broadcast satellite TV-Sat 2 as co-passenger) on an Ariane 4 launch vehicle, flight V33, from Centre Spatial Guyanais, Kourou, French Guiana, on 8 August 1989. It was launched into a geostationary transfer orbit (GTO), but the Mage-2 apogee kick motor failed to fire, and the intended geostationary orbit was never achieved. However, with the addition of further ground stations, in addition to ESA operations control centre at European Space Operations Centre (ESOC) in Germany, the satellite was successfully operated in GTO for almost 3.5 years. All of the original mission goals were, eventually, exceeded.

Including an estimate for the scientific activities related to the satellite observations and data processing, the Hipparcos mission cost about €600 million (in year 2000 economic conditions), and its execution involved some 200 European scientists and more than 2,000 individuals in European industry.

== Hipparcos Input Catalogue ==
The satellite observations relied on a pre-defined list of target stars. Stars were observed as the satellite rotated, by a sensitive region of the image dissector tube detector. This pre-defined star list formed the Hipparcos Input Catalogue (HIC): each star in the final Hipparcos Catalogue was contained in the Input Catalogue. The Input Catalogue was compiled by the INCA Consortium over the period 1982–1989, finalised pre-launch, and published both digitally and in printed form.

Although fully superseded by the satellite results, it nevertheless includes supplemental information on multiple system components as well as compilations of radial velocities and spectral types which, not observed by the satellite, were not included in the published Hipparcos Catalogue.

Constraints on total observing time, and on the uniformity of stars across the celestial sphere for satellite operations and data analysis, led to an Input Catalogue of some 118,000 stars. It merged two components: first, a survey of around 58,000 objects as complete as possible to the following limiting magnitudes: V<7.9 + 1.1sin|b| for spectral types earlier than G5, and V<7.3 + 1.1sin|b| for spectral types later than G5 (b is the Galactic latitude). Stars constituting this survey are flagged in the Hipparcos Catalogue.

The second component comprised additional stars selected according to their scientific interest, with none fainter than about magnitude V=13 mag. These were selected from around 200 scientific proposals submitted on the basis of an Invitation for Proposals issued by ESA in 1982, and prioritised by the Scientific Proposal Selection Committee in consultation with the Input Catalogue Consortium. This selection had to balance 'a priori' scientific interest, and the observing programme's limiting magnitude, total observing time, and sky uniformity constraints.

== Data reductions ==
For the main mission results, the data analysis was carried out by two independent scientific teams, NDAC and FAST, together comprising some 100 astronomers and scientists, mostly from European (ESA member state) institutes. The analyses, proceeding from nearly 1000 Gbit of satellite data acquired over 3.5 years, incorporated a comprehensive system of cross-checking and validation, and is described in detail in the published catalogue.

A detailed optical calibration model was included to map the transformation from sky to instrumental coordinates. Its adequacy could be verified by the detailed measurement residuals. The Earth's orbit, and the satellite's orbit with respect to the Earth, were essential for describing the location of the observer at each epoch of observation, and were supplied by an appropriate Earth ephemeris combined with accurate satellite ranging. Corrections due to special relativity (stellar aberration) made use of the corresponding satellite velocity. Modifications due to general relativistic light bending were significant (4 milliarc-sec at 90° to the ecliptic) and corrected for deterministically assuming γ=1 in the PPN formalism. Residuals were examined to establish limits on any deviations from this general relativistic value, and no significant discrepancies were found.

== Reference frame ==
The satellite observations essentially yielded highly accurate relative positions of stars with respect to each other, throughout the measurement period (1989–1993). In the absence of direct observations of extragalactic sources (apart from marginal observations of quasar 3C 273) the resulting rigid reference frame was transformed to an inertial frame of reference linked to extragalactic sources. This allows surveys at different wavelengths to be directly correlated with the Hipparcos stars, and ensures that the catalogue proper motions are, as far as possible, kinematically non-rotating. The determination of the relevant three solid-body rotation angles, and the three time-dependent rotation rates, was conducted and completed in advance of the catalogue publication. This resulted in an accurate but indirect link to an inertial, extragalactic, reference frame.

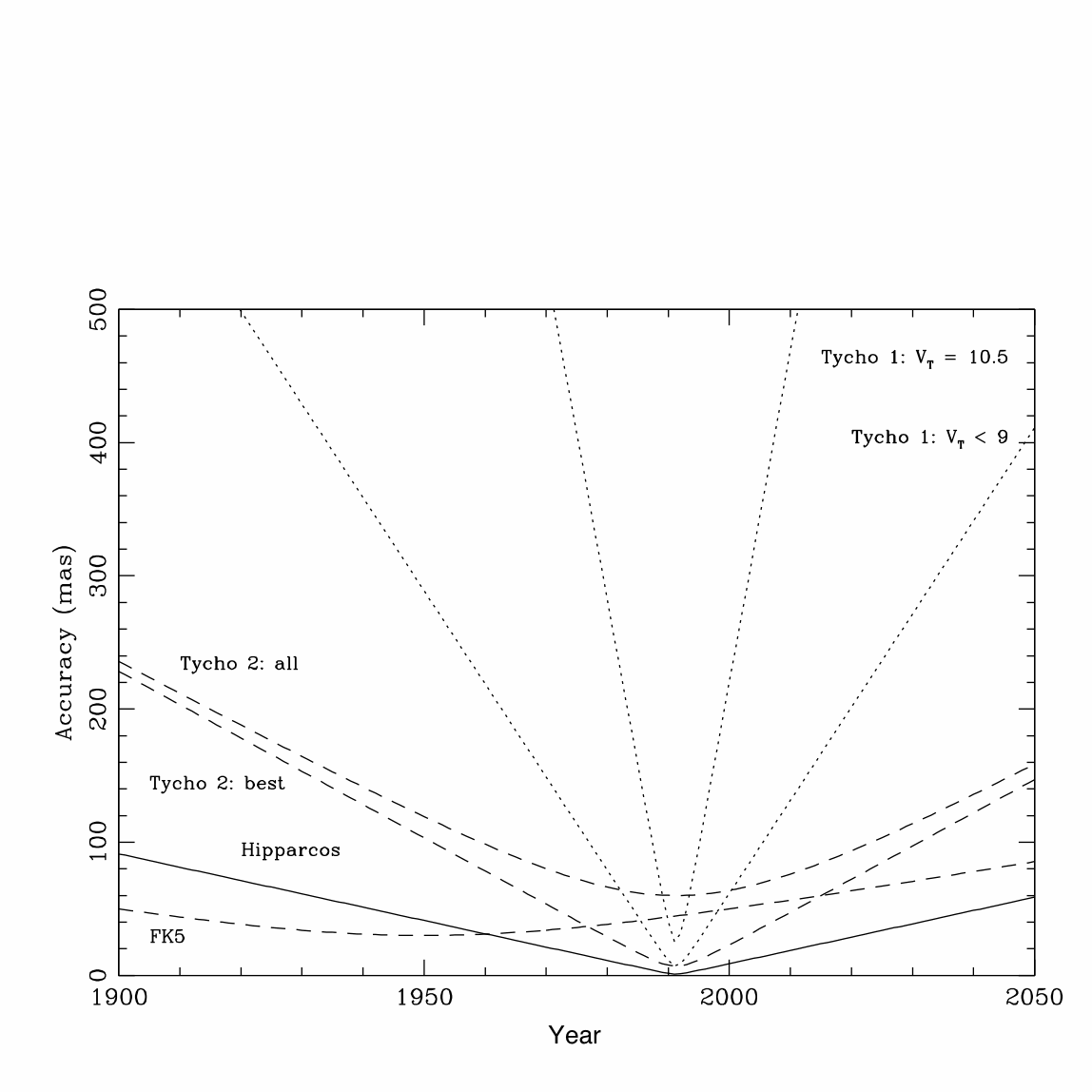
Typical accuracies of the FK5, Hipparcos, Tycho-1, and Tycho-2 Catalogues as a function of time. Tycho-1 dependencies are shown for two representative magnitudes. For Tycho-2, a typical proper motion error of 2.5 milliarc-sec applies to both bright stars (positional error at J1991.25 of 7 milliarc-sec) and faint stars (positional error at J1991.25 of 60 milliarc-sec).

A variety of methods to establish this reference frame link before catalogue publication were included and appropriately weighted: interferometric observations of radio stars by VLBI networks, MERLIN and Very Large Array (VLA); observations of quasars relative to Hipparcos stars using charge-coupled device (CCD), photographic plates, and the Hubble Space Telescope; photographic programmes to determine stellar proper motions with respect to extragalactic objects (Bonn, Kiev, Lick, Potsdam, Yale/San Juan); and comparison of Earth rotation parameters obtained by Very-long-baseline interferometry (VLBI) and by ground-based optical observations of Hipparcos stars. Although very different in terms of instruments, observational methods and objects involved, the various techniques generally agreed to within 10 milliarc-sec in the orientation and 1 milliarc-sec/year in the rotation of the system. From appropriate weighting, the coordinate axes defined by the published catalogue are believed to be aligned with the extragalactic radio frame to within ±0.6 milliarc-sec at the epoch J1991.25, and non-rotating with respect to distant extragalactic objects to within ±0.25 milliarc-sec/yr.

The Hipparcos and Tycho Catalogues were then constructed such that the resulting Hipparcos celestial reference frame (HCRF) coincides, to within observational uncertainties, with the International Celestial Reference Frame (ICRF), and representing the best estimates at the time of the catalogue completion (in 1996). The HCRF is thus a materialisation of the International Celestial Reference System (ICRS) in the optical domain. It extends and improves the J2000 (FK5) system, retaining approximately the global orientation of that system but without its regional errors.

== Double and multiple stars ==
Whilst of enormous astronomical importance, double stars and multiple stars provided considerable complications to the observations (due to the finite size and profile of the detector's sensitive field of view) and to the data analysis. The data processing classified the astrometric solutions as follows:

- single-star solutions: 100,038 entries, of which 6,763 were flagged as suspected double
- component solutions (Annex C): 13,211 entries, comprising 24,588 components in 12,195 solutions
- acceleration solutions (Annex G): 2,622 solutions
- orbital solutions (Annex O): 235 entries
- variability-induced movers (Annex V): 288 entries
- stochastic solutions (Annex X): 1,561 entries
- no valid astrometric solution: 263 entries (of which 218 were flagged as suspected double)

If a binary star has a long orbital period such that non-linear motions of the photocentre were insignificant over the short (3-year) measurement duration, the binary nature of the star would pass unrecognised by Hipparcos, but could show as a Hipparcos proper motion discrepant compared to those established from long temporal baseline proper motion programmes on ground. Higher-order photocentric motions could be represented by a 7-parameter, or even 9-parameter model fit (compared to the standard 5-parameter model), and typically such models could be enhanced in complexity until suitable fits were obtained. A complete orbit, requiring 7 elements, was determined for 45 systems. Orbital periods close to one year can become degenerate with the parallax, resulting in unreliable solutions for both. Triple or higher-order systems provided further challenges to the data processing.

== Photometric observations ==
The highest accuracy photometric data were provided as a by-product of the main mission astrometric observations. They were made in a broad-band visible light passband, specific to Hipparcos, and designated H_{p}. The median photometric precision, for H_{p}<9 magnitude, was 0.0015 magnitude, with typically 110 distinct observations per star throughout the 3.5-year observation period. As part of the data reduction and catalogue production, new variables were identified and designated with appropriate variable star designations. Variable stars were classified as periodic or unsolved variables; the former were published with estimates of their period, variability amplitude, and variability type. In total some 11,597 variable objects were detected, of which 8,237 were newly classified as variable. There are, for example, 273 Cepheid variables, 186 RR Lyrae variables, 108 Delta Scuti variables, and 917 eclipsing binary stars. The star mapper observations, constituting the Tycho (and Tycho-2) Catalogue, provided two colours, roughly B and V in the Johnson UBV photometric system, important for spectral classification and effective temperature determination.

== Radial velocities ==
Classical astrometry concerns only motions in the plane of the sky and ignores the star's radial velocity, i.e. its space motion along the line-of-sight. Whilst critical for an understanding of stellar kinematics, and hence population dynamics, its effect is generally imperceptible to astrometric measurements (in the plane of the sky), and therefore it is generally ignored in large-scale astrometric surveys. In practice, it can be measured as a Doppler shift of the spectral lines. More strictly, however, the radial velocity does enter a rigorous astrometric formulation. Specifically, a space velocity along the line-of-sight means that the transformation from tangential linear velocity to (angular) proper motion is a function of time. The resulting effect of secular or perspective acceleration is the interpretation of a transverse acceleration actually arising from a purely linear space velocity with a significant radial component, with the positional effect proportional to the product of the parallax, the proper motion, and the radial velocity. At the accuracy levels of Hipparcos it is of (marginal) importance only for the nearest stars with the largest radial velocities and proper motions, but was accounted for in the 21 cases for which the accumulated positional effect over two years exceeds 0.1 milliarc-sec. Radial velocities for Hipparcos Catalogue stars, to the extent that they are presently known from independent ground-based surveys, can be found from the astronomical database of the Centre de données astronomiques de Strasbourg.

The absence of reliable distances for the majority of stars means that the angular measurements made, astrometrically, in the plane of the sky, cannot generally be converted into true space velocities in the plane of the sky. For this reason, astrometry characterises the transverse motions of stars in angular measure (e.g. arcsec per year) rather than in km/s or equivalent. Similarly, the typical absence of reliable radial velocities means that the transverse space motion (when known) is, in any case, only a component of the complete, three-dimensional, space velocity.

== Published catalogues ==
Principal observational characteristics of the Hipparcos and Tycho Catalogues. ICRS is the International Celestial Reference System.
Property	Value
Common:
Measurement period	1989.8–1993.2
Catalogue epoch	J1991.25
Reference system	ICRS
• coincidence with ICRS (3 axes)	±0.6 mas
• deviation from inertial (3 axes)	±0.25 mas/yr
Hipparcos Catalogue:
Number of entries	118,218
• with associated astrometry	117,955
• with associated photometry	118,204
Mean sky density	≈3 per sq deg
Limiting magnitude	V≈12.4 mag
Completeness	V=7.3–9.0 mag
Tycho Catalogue:
Number of entries	1,058,332
• based on Tycho data	1,052,031
• with only Hipparcos data	6301
Mean sky density	25 per sq deg
Limiting magnitude	V≈11.5 mag
Completeness to 90 per cent	V≈10.5 mag
Completeness to 99.9 per cent	V≈10.0 mag
Tycho 2 Catalogue:
Number of entries	2,539,913
Mean sky density:	
• at b=0°	≈150 per sq deg
• at b=±30°	≈50 per sq deg
• at b=±90°	≈25 per sq deg
Completeness to 90 per cent	V≈11.5 mag
Completeness to 99 per cent	V≈11.0 mag

Equirectangular plot of declination vs right ascension of stars brighter than apparent magnitude 5 on the Hipparcos Catalogue, coded by spectral type and apparent magnitude, relative to the modern constellations and the ecliptic

The final Hipparcos Catalogue was the result of the critical comparison and merging of the two (NDAC and FAST consortia) analyses, and contains 118,218 entries (stars or multiple stars), corresponding to an average of some three stars per square degree over the entire sky. Median precision of the five astrometric parameters (Hp<9 magnitude) exceeded the original mission goals, and are between 0.6 and 1.0 mas. Some 20,000 distances were determined to better than 10%, and 50,000 to better than 20%. The inferred ratio of external to standard errors is ≈1.0–1.2, and estimated systematic errors are below 0.1 mas. The number of solved or suspected double or multiple stars is 23,882. Photometric observations yielded multi-epoch photometry with a mean number of 110 observations per star, and a median photometric precision (Hp<9 magnitude) of 0.0015 magnitude, with 11,597 entries were identified as variable or possibly-variable.

For the star mapper results, the data analysis was carried out by the Tycho Data Analysis Consortium (TDAC). The Tycho Catalogue comprises more than one million stars with 20–30 milliarc-sec astrometry and two-colour (B and V band) photometry.

The final Hipparcos and Tycho Catalogues were completed in August 1996. The catalogues were published by European Space Agency (ESA) on behalf of the scientific teams in June 1997.

A more extensive analysis of the star mapper (Tycho) data extracted additional faint stars from the data stream. Combined with old photographic plate observations made several decades earlier as part of the Astrographic Catalogue programme, the Tycho-2 Catalogue of more than 2.5 million stars (and fully superseding the original Tycho Catalogue) was published in 2000.

The Hipparcos and Tycho-1 Catalogues were used to create the Millennium Star Atlas: an all-sky atlas of one million stars to visual magnitude 11. Some 10,000 nonstellar objects are also included to complement the catalogue data.

Between 1997 and 2007, investigations into subtle effects in the satellite attitude and instrument calibration continued. A number of effects in the data that had not been fully accounted for were studied, such as scan-phase discontinuities and micrometeoroid-induced attitude jumps. A re-reduction of the associated steps of the analysis was eventually undertaken.

This has led to improved astrometric accuracies for stars brighter than Hp=9.0 magnitude, reaching a factor of about three for the brightest stars (Hp<4.5 magnitude), while also underlining the conclusion that the Hipparcos Catalogue as originally published is generally reliable within the quoted accuracies.

All catalogue data are available online from the Centre de données astronomiques de Strasbourg.

== Scientific results ==
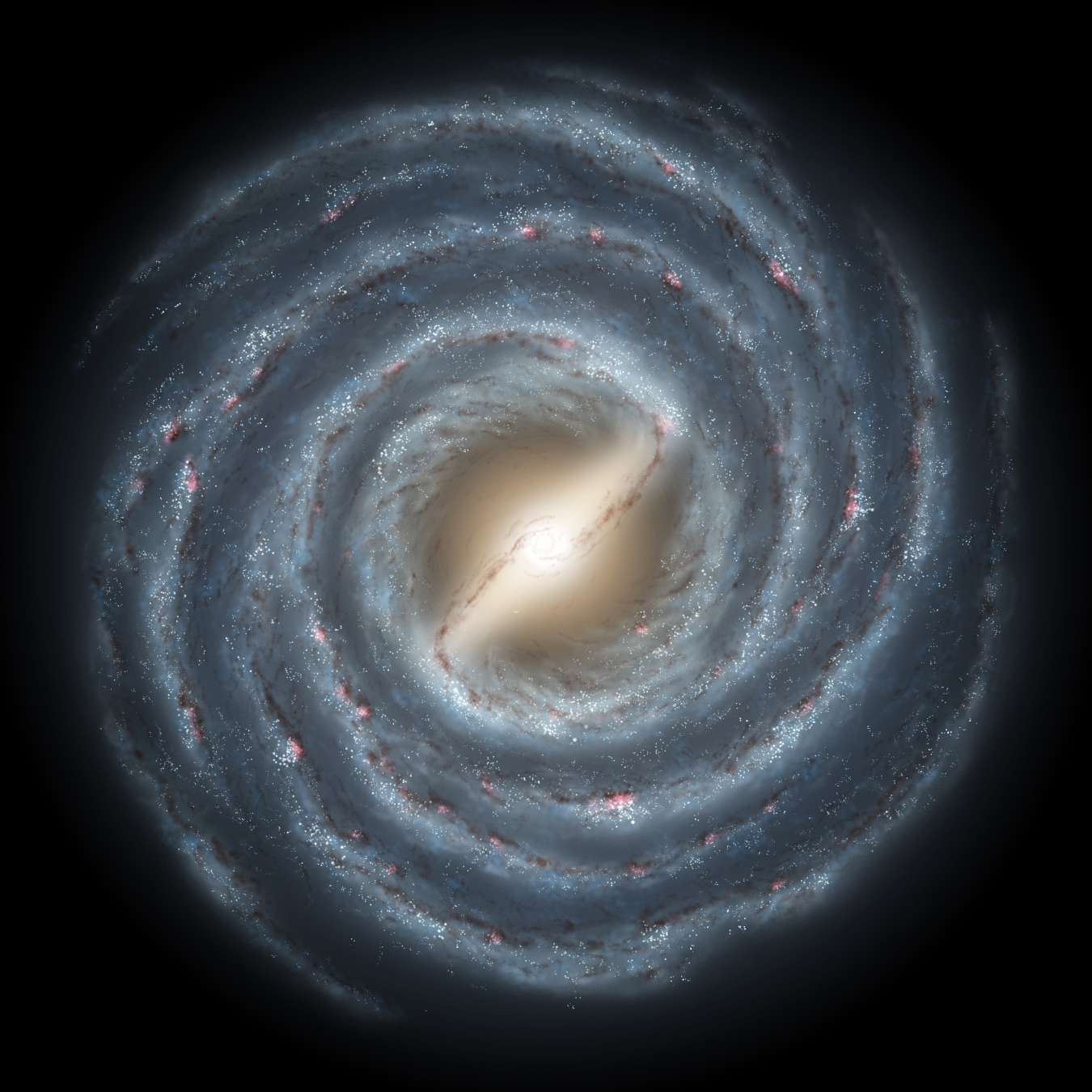
Artist's concept of the Milky Way galaxy, showing two prominent spiral arms attached to the ends of a thick central bar. Hipparcos mapped many stars in the solar neighbourhood with great accuracy, though this represents only a small fraction of stars in the galaxy.

The Hipparcos results have affected a very broad range of astronomical research, which can be classified into three major themes:

- the provision of an accurate reference frame: this has allowed the consistent and rigorous re-reduction of historical astrometric measurements, including those from Schmidt plates, meridian circles, the 100-year-old Astrographic Catalogue, and 150 years of Earth-orientation measurements. These, in turn, have yielded a dense reference framework with high-accuracy, long-term proper motions (the Tycho-2 Catalogue). Reduction of current state-of-the-art survey data has yielded the dense UCAC2 Catalogue of the U.S. Naval Observatory on the same reference system, and improved astrometric data from recent surveys such as the Sloan Digital Sky Survey and 2MASS. Implicit in the high-accuracy reference frame is the measurement of gravitational lensing and the detection and characterisation of double and multiple stars;
- constraints on stellar structure and stellar evolution: the accurate distances and luminosities of 100,000 stars has provided the most comprehensive and accurate data set of fundamental stellar parameters to date, placing constraints on internal rotation, element diffusion, convective motions, and asteroseismology. Combined with theoretical models and other data it yields evolutionary masses, radii, and ages for large numbers of stars covering a wide range of evolutionary states;
- Galactic kinematics and dynamics: the uniform and accurate distances and proper motions have provided a substantial advance in understanding of stellar kinematics and the dynamical structure of the solar neighbourhood, ranging from the presence and evolution of clusters, associations and moving groups, the presence of resonance motions due to the Galaxy's central bar and spiral arms, determination of the parameters describing galactic rotation, discrimination of the disk and halo populations, evidence for halo accretion, and the measurement of space motions of runaway stars, globular clusters, and many other types of star.

Associated with these major themes, Hipparcos has provided results in topics as diverse as Solar System science, including mass determinations of asteroids, Earth's rotation and Chandler wobble; the internal structure of white dwarfs; the masses of brown dwarfs; the characterisation of extra-solar planets and their host stars; the height of the Sun above the Galactic mid-plane; the age of the Universe; the stellar initial mass function and star formation rates; and strategies for the search for extraterrestrial intelligence. The high-precision multi-epoch photometry has been used to measure variability and stellar pulsations in many classes of objects. The Hipparcos and Tycho catalogues are now routinely used to point ground-based telescopes, navigate space missions, and drive public planetaria.

Since 1997, several thousand scientific papers have been published making use of the Hipparcos and Tycho catalogues. A detailed review of the Hipparcos scientific literature between 1997 and 2007 was published in 2009, and a popular account of the project in 2010. Some examples of notable results include (listed chronologically):

- studies of Galactic rotation from Cepheid variables
- the nature of Delta Scuti variables
- studies of local stellar kinematics
- testing the white dwarf mass–radius relation
- the structure and dynamics of the Hyades cluster
- kinematics of Wolf–Rayet stars and O-type runaway stars
- subdwarf parallaxes: metal-rich clusters and the thick disk
- fine structure of the red giant clump and associated distance determinations
- unexpected stellar velocity distribution in the warped Galactic disk
- confirming the Lutz–Kelker bias of parallax measurement
- refining the Oort and Galactic constants
- Galactic disk dark matter, terrestrial impact cratering and the law of large numbers
- vertical motion and expansion of the Gould Belt
- the use of gamma-ray bursts as direction and time markers in SETI strategies
- evidence of a galaxy merger in the early formation history of the Milky Way
- study of nearby OB associations
- close approaches of stars to the Solar System
- studies of binary star orbits and masses
- the HD 209458 planetary transits
- formation of the stellar Galactic halo and thick disk
- the local density of matter in the Galaxy and the Oort limit
- ice age epochs and the Sun's path through the Galaxy
- local kinematics of K and M giants and the concept of superclusters
- an improved reference frame for long-term Earth rotation studies
- the local stellar velocity field in the Galaxy
- Identification of two possible "siblings" of the Sun (HIP 87382 and HIP 47399), to be studied for evidence of exoplanets

=== The Pleiades distance controversy ===
One controversial result has been the derived proximity, at about 120 parsecs, of the Pleiades cluster, established both from the original catalogue as well as from the revised analysis. This has been contested by various other recent work, placing the mean cluster distance at around 130 parsecs.

According to a 2012 paper, the anomaly was due to the use of a weighted mean when there is a correlation between distances and distance errors for stars in clusters. It is resolved by using an unweighted mean. There is no systematic bias in the Hipparcos data when it comes to star clusters.

In August 2014, the discrepancy between the cluster distance of 120.2±1.5 parsecs (pc) as measured by Hipparcos and the distance of 133.5±1.2 pc derived with other techniques was confirmed by parallax measurements made using VLBI, which gave 136.2±1.2 pc, the most accurate and precise distance yet presented for the cluster.

=== Polaris ===
Another distance debate set-off by Hipparcos is for the distance to the star Polaris.

=== Hipparcos-Gaia ===
Hipparcos data is recently being used together with Gaia data. Especially the comparison of the proper motion of stars from both spacecraft is being used to search for hidden binary companions. Hipparcos-Gaia data is also used to measure the dynamical mass of known binaries, such as substellar companions. Hipparcos-Gaia data was used to measure the mass of the exoplanet Beta Pictoris b and is sometimes used to study other long-period exoplanets, such as HR 5183 b.

== People ==
- Pierre Lacroute (Observatory of Strasbourg): proposer of space astrometry in 1967
- Michael Perryman: ESA project scientist (1981–1997), and project manager during satellite operations (1989–1993)
- Catherine Turon (Observatoire de Paris-Meudon): leader of Input Catalogue Consortium
- Erik Høg: leader of the TDAC Consortium
- Lennart Lindegren (Lund Observatory): leader of the NDAC Consortium
- Jean Kovalevsky: leader of the FAST Consortium
- Adriaan Blaauw: chair of the observing programme selection committee
- Hipparcos Science Team: Uli Bastian, Pierluigi Bernacca, Michel Crézé, Francesco Donati, Michel Grenon, Michael Grewing, Erik Høg, Jean Kovalevsky, Floor van Leeuwen, Lennart Lindegren, Hans van der Marel, Francois Mignard, Andrew Murray, Michael Perryman (chair), Rudolf Le Poole, Hans Schrijver, Catherine Turon
- Franco Emiliani: ESA project manager (1981–1985)
- Hamid Hassan: ESA project manager (1985–1989)
- Dietmar Heger: ESA/ESOC spacecraft operations manager
- Michel Bouffard: Matra Marconi Space project manager
- Bruno Strim: Alenia Spazio project manager

== See also ==
- Gaia, follow-up mission launched in 2013
