= Galaxy rotation curve =

Observed discrepancy in galactic angular momenta

The rotation curve of spiral galaxy UGC 11455. The observed rotation is shown as datapoints. The expected rotation from normal matter is shown using lines. The difference can be explained by the presence of dark matter.

Left: A simulated galaxy without dark matter. Right: Galaxy with a flat rotation curve that would be expected with dark matter.

The rotation curve of a disc galaxy (also called a velocity curve) is a plot of the orbital speeds of visible stars or gas in that galaxy versus their radial distance from that galaxy's centre. It is typically rendered graphically as a plot, and the data observed from each side of a spiral galaxy are generally asymmetric, so that data from each side are averaged to create the curve. The experimental curves observed are at significant variance with gravitational theory applied to the matter observed in a galaxy. Theories involving unobservable dark matter are the main postulated explanation of this discrepancy.

Considering their mass distributions, the rotational/orbital speeds of galaxies/stars would not be expected to follow rules such as Kepler's third law applying to smaller orbital systems such as stars/planets and planets/moons with most mass at the centre. Stars revolve around their galaxy's centre at equal or increasing speed over a large range of distances. Even considering this, however, the mass estimations for galaxies based on the light they emit are far too low to explain the velocity observations.

Though dark matter is by far the most accepted explanation of the rotation problem, other theories have been proposed. One of the most notable is modified Newtonian dynamics (MOND), which involves alternative laws of gravitation.

== History ==
Vesto Slipher made the first measurements related to galaxy rotation curves in 1914 when observing the Andromeda galaxy. Slipher observed that the stars on the left side of the galaxy's bulge were approaching at speeds of around 320 km/s, faster than those on the right, which were moving at about 280 km/s. This suggested that the galaxy's disc was rotating in such a way that it appeared to be spinning toward us.

In 1918 Francis Pease determined the rotation speed within the central region of Andromeda. His findings were represented by the formula $\displaystyle V_c = -0.48 r - 316$, where $V_c$ is the measured circular speed (in km/s) at a distance $r$ from the center of Andromeda's bulge. The results indicated that the central part of the galaxy rotates at a constant angular speed.

In 1932, Jan Hendrik Oort became the first to report that measurements of the stars in the solar neighborhood indicated that they moved faster than expected when a mass distribution based upon visible matter was assumed, but these measurements were later determined to be essentially erroneous. In 1939, Horace Babcock reported in his PhD thesis measurements of the rotation curve for Andromeda which suggested that the mass-to-luminosity ratio increases radially. He attributed that to either the absorption of light within the galaxy or to modified dynamics in the outer portions of the spiral and not to any form of missing matter. Babcock's measurements turned out to disagree substantially with those found later, and the first measurement of an extended rotation curve in good agreement with modern data was published in 1957 by Henk van de Hulst and collaborators, who studied M31 with the Dwingeloo Radio Observatory's newly commissioned 25-meter radio telescope. A companion paper by Maarten Schmidt showed that this rotation curve could be fit by a flattened mass distribution more extensive than the light. In 1959, Louise Volders used the same telescope to demonstrate that the spiral galaxy M33 also does not spin as expected according to Keplerian dynamics.

Reporting on NGC 3115, Jan Oort wrote that "the distribution of mass in the system appears to bear almost no relation to that of light... one finds the ratio of mass to light in the outer parts of NGC 3115 to be about 250". On page 302–303 of his journal article, he wrote that "The strongly condensed luminous system appears imbedded in a large and more or less homogeneous mass of great density" and although he went on to speculate that this mass may be either extremely faint dwarf stars or interstellar gas and dust, he had clearly detected the dark matter halo of this galaxy.

Galaxy rotation curve for the Milky Way. The vertical axis is the rotation speed about the galactic center. The horizontal axis is the distance from the galactic center. The Sun is marked in yellow. The observed rotation speed curve is marked by data points. The predicted curve based on the stellar mass and gas of the Milky Way is in black. The difference is due to dark matter or possibly a modification of gravity like MOND. The data shown can be found here.

The Carnegie telescope (Carnegie Double Astrograph) was intended to study this problem of Galactic rotation.

Oort also did work on motion inside the Milky Way, and tried to determine what are known as the Oort constants, but did not find very accurate values. With space telescopes like Hipparcos and Gaia it has been possible to study the rotation of the Milky Way much more accurately.

In the late 1960s and early 1970s, Vera Rubin, an astronomer at the Department of Terrestrial Magnetism at the Carnegie Institution of Washington, worked with a new sensitive spectrograph that could measure the velocity curve of edge-on spiral galaxies to a greater degree of accuracy than had ever before been achieved. Together with fellow staff-member Kent Ford, Rubin announced at a 1975 meeting of the American Astronomical Society the discovery that most stars in spiral galaxies orbit at roughly the same speed, and that this implied that galaxy masses grow approximately linearly with radius well beyond the location of most of the stars (the galactic bulge). Rubin presented her results in an influential paper in 1980. These results suggested either that Newtonian gravity does not apply universally or that, conservatively, upwards of 50% of the mass of galaxies was contained in the relatively dark galactic halo. Although initially met with skepticism, Rubin's results have been confirmed over the subsequent decades.

If Newtonian mechanics is assumed to be correct, it would follow that most of the mass of the galaxy had to be in the galactic bulge near the center and that the stars and gas in the disk portion should orbit the center at decreasing velocities with radial distance from the galactic center (the dashed line in Fig. 1).

Observations of the rotation curve of spirals, however, do not bear this out. Rather, the curves do not decrease in the expected inverse square root relationship but are "flat", i.e. outside of the central bulge the speed is nearly a constant (the solid line in Fig. 1). It is also observed that galaxies with a uniform distribution of luminous matter have a rotation curve that rises from the center to the edge, and most low-surface-brightness galaxies (LSB galaxies) have the same anomalous rotation curve.

The rotation curves might be explained by hypothesizing the existence of a substantial amount of matter permeating the galaxy outside of the central bulge that is not emitting light in the mass-to-light ratio of the central bulge. The material responsible for the extra mass was dubbed dark matter, the existence of which was first posited in the 1930s by Jan Oort in his measurements of the Oort constants and Fritz Zwicky in his studies of the masses of galaxy clusters.

== Dark matter ==
While the observed galaxy rotation curves were one of the first indications that some mass in the universe may not be visible, many different lines of evidence now support the concept of cold dark matter as the dominant form of matter in the universe. Among the lines of evidence are mass-to-light ratios which are much too low without a dark matter component, the amount of hot gas detected in galactic clusters by x-ray astronomy, measurements of cluster mass with the Sunyaev–Zeldovich effect and with gravitational lensing. Models of the formation of galaxies are based on their dark matter halos. The existence of non-baryonic cold dark matter (CDM) is today a major feature of the Lambda-CDM model that describes the cosmology of the universe and matches high precision astrophysical observations.

== Further investigations ==
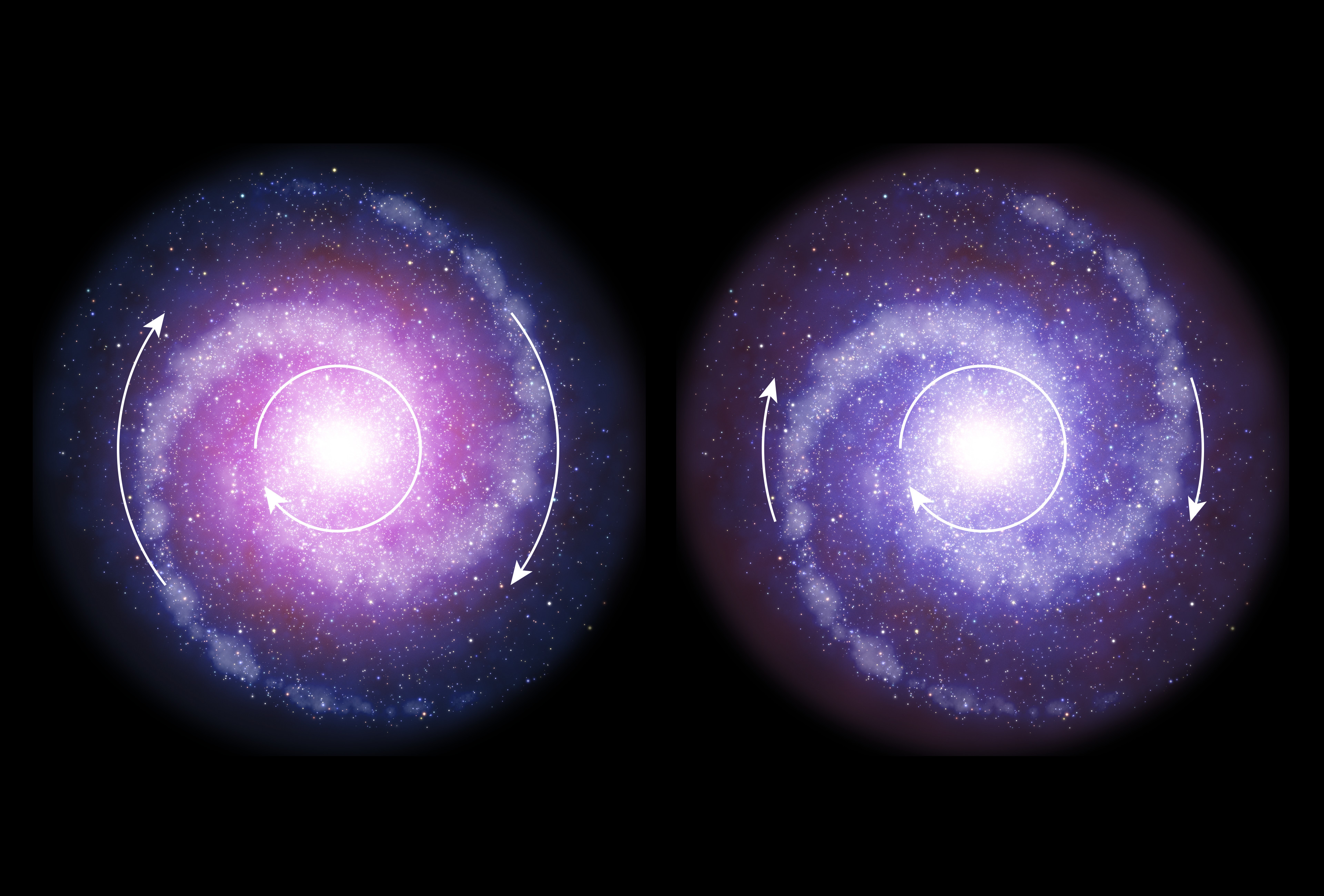
Comparison of rotating disc galaxies in the present day (left) and the distant Universe (right).

The rotational dynamics of galaxies are well characterized by their position on the Tully–Fisher relation, which shows that for spiral galaxies the rotational velocity is uniquely related to their total luminosity. A consistent way to predict the rotational velocity of a spiral galaxy is to measure its bolometric luminosity and then read its rotation rate from its location on the Tully–Fisher diagram. Conversely, knowing the rotational velocity of a spiral galaxy gives its luminosity. Thus the magnitude of the galaxy rotation is related to the galaxy's visible mass.

While precise fitting of the bulge, disk, and halo density profiles is a rather complicated process, it is straightforward to model the observables of rotating galaxies through this relationship. So, while state-of-the-art cosmological and galaxy formation simulations of dark matter with normal baryonic matter included can be matched to galaxy observations, there is not yet any straightforward explanation as to why the observed scaling relationship exists. Additionally, detailed investigations of the rotation curves of low-surface-brightness galaxies (LSB galaxies) in the 1990s and of their position on the Tully–Fisher relation showed that LSB galaxies had to have dark matter haloes that are more extended and less dense than those of galaxies with high surface brightness, and thus surface brightness is related to the halo properties. Such dark-matter-dominated dwarf galaxies may hold the key to solving the dwarf galaxy problem of structure formation.

The analysis of the inner parts of low and high surface brightness galaxies showed that the shape of the rotation curves in the centre of dark-matter dominated systems indicates a profile different from the Navarro–Frenk–White profile spatial mass distribution profile created by numerical fits to model profiles for dark matter halos. This so-called cuspy halo problem is a persistent problem for the standard Lambda-CDM model. Models with approximately constant dark matter density in the core of galaxies match observations.

== Halo density profiles ==
In order to accommodate a flat rotation curve, a density profile for a galaxy and its environs must be different from one that is centrally concentrated. Newton's version of Kepler's Third Law implies that the spherically symmetric, radial density profile ρ(r) is:
$$\rho(r) = \frac{v(r)^2 }{4 \pi G r^2}\left(1+2~ \frac{d\log v(r)}{d\log r}\right)$$
where v(r) is the radial orbital velocity profile and G is the gravitational constant. This profile closely matches the expectations of a singular isothermal sphere profile where if v(r) is approximately constant then the density ρ ∝ r^{−2} to some inner "core radius" where the density is then assumed constant. Observations do not comport with such a simple profile, as reported by Navarro, Frenk, and White in a seminal 1996 paper.

The authors then remarked that a "gently changing logarithmic slope" for a density profile function could also accommodate approximately flat rotation curves over large scales. They found the famous Navarro–Frenk–White profile, which is consistent both with N-body simulations and observations given by
$$\rho (r) = \frac{\rho_0}{\frac{r}{R_s}\left(1+\frac{r}{R_s}\right)^2}$$
where the central density, ρ_{0}, and the scale radius, R_{s}, are parameters that vary from halo to halo. Because the slope of the density profile diverges at the center, other alternative profiles have been proposed, for example the Einasto profile, which has exhibited better agreement with certain dark matter halo simulations.

Observations of orbit velocities in spiral galaxies suggest a mass structure according to:
$$v(r) = \left(r \, \frac{d\Phi}{dr}\right)^{1/2}$$
with Φ the galaxy gravitational potential.

Since observations of galaxy rotation do not match the distribution expected from application of Kepler's laws, they do not match the distribution of luminous matter. This implies that spiral galaxies contain large amounts of dark matter or, alternatively, the existence of exotic physics in action on galactic scales. The additional invisible component becomes progressively more conspicuous in each galaxy at outer radii and among galaxies in the less luminous ones.

A popular interpretation of these observations is that about 26% of the mass of the Universe is composed of dark matter, a hypothetical type of matter which does not emit or interact with electromagnetic radiation. Dark matter is believed to dominate the gravitational potential of galaxies and clusters of galaxies. Under this theory, galaxies are baryonic condensations of stars and gas (namely hydrogen and helium) that lie at the centers of much larger haloes of dark matter, affected by a gravitational instability caused by primordial density fluctuations.

Many cosmologists strive to understand the nature and the history of these ubiquitous dark haloes by investigating the properties of the galaxies they contain (i.e. their luminosities, kinematics, sizes, and morphologies). The measurement of the kinematics (their positions, velocities and accelerations) of the observable stars and gas has become a tool to investigate the nature of dark matter, as to its content and distribution relative to that of the various baryonic components of those galaxies.

== Alternatives to dark matter ==
Galaxy rotation curves are one important prediction of dark matter models that modified laws of gravity are able to explain without the dark matter hypothesis. For example, modified Newtonian dynamics (MOND), originally proposed by Mordehai Milgrom in 1983, modifies the Newtonian force law at low accelerations to enhance the effective gravitational attraction. Since that time many variations of the concept have been explored. These theories work well at the scale of galaxies even if they are not suitable for full models of cosmology.

Whereas the standard (Lambda-CDM) cosmological model postulates dark matter haloes to reproduce each galaxy's rotation curve, MOND has been shown to successfully predict the rotation curves of galaxies, include so-called low-surface-brightness galaxies which (according to the standard model) should be dark-matter dominated at all radii. MOND has made a number of other, often quite surprising, novel predictions that have subsequently been confirmed. For instance, MOND predicts a functional relation between the asymptotic rotation speed and total (non-dark) mass of a galaxy, $V = {\rm const.} \times M^{1/4}$, the so-called baryonic Tully–Fisher relation. MOND has also been shown to correctly predict the internal velocity dispersions of the small satellite galaxies of the Local Group, many of which should also be "dark-matter dominated" according to the standard model.

Using data from the Spitzer Photometry and Accurate Rotation Curves (SPARC) database, a group has found that the radial acceleration traced by rotation curves (an effect given the name "radial acceleration relation") could be predicted just from the observed baryon distribution (that is, including stars and gas but not dark matter). This so-called radial acceleration relation (RAR) might be fundamental for understanding the dynamics of galaxies. The same relation provided a good fit for 2693 samples in 153 rotating galaxies, with diverse shapes, masses, sizes, and gas fractions. Brightness in the near infrared, where the more stable light from red giants dominates, was used to estimate the density contribution due to stars more consistently. The results are consistent with MOND, and place limits on alternative explanations involving dark matter alone. Cosmological simulations within a Lambda-CDM framework produce different relations, with some producing a result similar to that observed and others leading to a different relation.

Attempts to model of galaxy rotation based on a general relativity metric, showing that the rotation curves for the Milky Way, NGC 3031, NGC 3198 and NGC 7331 are consistent with the mass density distributions of the visible matter and other similar work have been disputed. Solutions of the Einstein equations in the low-energy limit for a system composed of dust with axial symmetry and stationary rotation, serving as a toy model for a galaxy, exhibit non-Newtonian features such as flat rotation curves. These rotating systems are purely relativistic objects, as they have no Newtonian analogue.

According to recent analysis of the data produced by the Gaia spacecraft, it would seem possible to explain at least the Milky Way's rotation curve without requiring any dark matter if instead of a Newtonian approximation the entire set of equations of general relativity is adopted.

== See also ==
- List of unsolved problems in physics
- Long-slit spectroscopy
- Nonsymmetric gravitational theory

== Bibliography ==
- Galactic Astronomy, Dmitri Mihalas and Paul McRae. W. H. Freeman 1968.
