= Joan North =

English writer (1920–1999)

Joan Marian North (15 February 1920 – 1999) was a UK writer of children's books. Although set in the contemporary real world, North's stories deal with incursions into our world of mysterious powers or influences, which often lead to her young protagonists learning a greater sense of their true selves. As Searles, Meacham and Franklin say in A Reader's Guide to Fantasy, "The mental and spiritual attitudes of her protagonists influence greatly their success or failure."

== Biography ==
Born in Hendon, London, Joan North was the daughter of metallurgist Frank Wevil North and Gladys May Paybody. She was educated in England, Wales, and China, and went to King's College, London. She served in the Women's Auxiliary Air Force during World War II, and worked as a nurse, and a social worker, also working for the BBC, and for the Tate Gallery's publications department. She married C. A. Rogers, Astor Professor of Mathematics at the University of London, in 1952, with whom she had two daughters, Jane and Petra.

== Bibliography ==
- Emperor of the Moon (1956)
- The Cloud Forest (1965, 1966 in the US)
- The Whirling Shapes (1967)
- The Light Maze (1971)

The Light Maze was shortlisted for the Mythopoeic Award.

== Notes and references ==
- Science Fiction and Fantasy Literature, Volume 2 by R. Reginald, Douglas Menville, Mary A. Burgess, 1979
- Reader's Guide to Fantasy by Baird Serales, Beth Meacham and Michael Franklin, 1982
