= Oort constants =

Parameters characterizing properties of our galaxy

The Oort constants (discovered by Jan Oort) $A$ and $B$ are empirically derived parameters that characterize the local rotational properties of our galaxy, the Milky Way, in the following manner:

$$\begin{align}
& A=\frac{1}{2}\left(\frac{V_{0}}{R_{0}}-\frac{dv}{dr}\Bigg\vert_{R_{0}}\right) \\
& B= - \frac{1}{2}\left(\frac{V_{0}}{R_{0}}+\frac{dv}{dr}\Bigg\vert_{R_{0}}\right) \\
\end{align}$$

where $V_0$ and $R_0$ are the rotational velocity and distance to the Galactic Center, respectively, measured at the position of the Sun, and v and r are the velocities and distances at other positions in our part of the galaxy. The rotational velocity means the average speed of stars in the circumferential direction, which differs from that of a particular star or the sun. As derived below, A and B depend only on the motions and positions of stars in the solar neighborhood. As of 2018, the most accurate values of these constants are $A$ = 15.3 ± 0.4 km s^{−1} kpc^{−1}, $B$ = −11.9 ± 0.4 km s^{−1} kpc^{−1}.

== Historical significance and background ==
Orbits of stars around the galactic disk with faster angular velocity closer to the galaxy center but colored as seen from the Sun and plotted against the galactic longitude together with the same graph using data from Gaia

By the 1920s, a large fraction of the astronomical community had recognized that some of the diffuse, cloud-like objects, or nebulae, seen in the night sky were collections of stars located beyond our own local collection of star clusters. These galaxies had diverse morphologies, ranging from ellipsoids to disks. The concentrated band of starlight that is the visible signature of the Milky Way was indicative of a disk structure for our galaxy; however, our location within our galaxy made structural determinations from observations difficult.

Classical mechanics predicted that a collection of stars could be supported against gravitational collapse by either random velocities of the stars or their rotation about its center of mass. For a disk-shaped collection, the support should be mainly rotational. Depending on the mass density, or distribution of the mass in the disk, the rotation velocity may be different at each radius from the center of the disk to the outer edge. A plot of these rotational velocities against the radii at which they are measured is called a rotation curve. For disk galaxies other than the Milky Way, one can measure the rotation curve by observing the Doppler shifts of spectral features measured along different galactic radii, since one side of the galaxy will be moving towards our line of sight and one side away. However, our position in the galactic midplane of the Milky Way, where dust in molecular clouds obscures most optical light in many directions, made obtaining our own rotation curve technically difficult until the discovery of the 21 cm hydrogen line in the 1930s.

To confirm the rotation of our galaxy prior to this, in 1927 Jan Oort derived a way to confirm Galactic rotation from just a small fraction of stars in the local neighborhood. As described below, the values he found for $A$ and $B$ proved not only that the Galaxy was rotating but also that it rotates differentially, or as a fluid rather than a solid body.

== Derivation ==
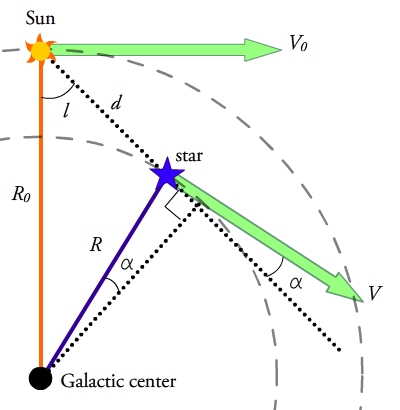
Figure 1: Geometry of the Oort constants derivation, with a field star close to the Sun in the midplane of the Galaxy.

Consider a star in the midplane of the galactic disk with Galactic longitude $l$ at a distance $d$ from the Sun. Assume that both the star and the Sun have circular orbits around the center of the Galaxy at radii of $R$ and $R_{0}$ from the Galactic Center and rotational velocities of $V$ and $V_{0}$, respectively. The motion of the star along our line of sight, or radial velocity, and motion of the star across the plane of the sky, or transverse velocity, as observed from the position of the Sun are then:

$$\begin{align}
& V_{\text{obs, r}}=V_{\text{star, r}}-V_{\text{sun, r}}=V\cos\left(\alpha\right)-V_{0}\sin\left(l\right) \\
& V_{\text{obs, t}}=V_{\text{star, t}}-V_{\text{sun, t}}=V\sin\left(\alpha\right)-V_{0}\cos\left(l\right) \\
\end{align}$$

With the assumption of circular motion, the rotational velocity is related to the angular velocity by $v=\Omega r$ and we can substitute this into the velocity expressions:

$$\begin{align}
& V_{\text{obs, r}}=\Omega R\cos\left(\alpha\right)-\Omega_{0}R_{0}\sin\left(l\right) \\
& V_{\text{obs, t}}=\Omega R\sin\left(\alpha\right)-\Omega_{0}R_{0}\cos\left(l\right) \\
\end{align}$$

From the geometry in Figure 1, one can see that the triangles formed between the Galactic Center, the Sun, and the star share a side or portions of sides, so the following relationships hold and substitutions can be made:

$$\begin{align}
& R\cos\left(\alpha\right)=R_{0}\sin\left(l\right)   \\
& R\sin\left(\alpha\right)=R_{0}\cos\left(l\right)-d \\
\end{align}$$

and with these we get

$$\begin{align}
& V_{\text{obs, r}}=\left(\Omega-\Omega_{0}\right)R_{0}\sin\left(l\right)          \\
& V_{\text{obs, t}}=\left(\Omega-\Omega_{0}\right)R_{0}\cos\left(l\right)-\Omega d \\
\end{align}$$

To put these expressions only in terms of the known quantities $l$ and $d$, we take a Taylor expansion of $\Omega-\Omega_{0}$ about $R_{0}$.

$$\left(\Omega-\Omega_{0}\right)=\left(R-R_{0}\right)\frac{d\Omega}{dr}\Bigg\vert_{R_{0}}+...$$

Additionally, we take advantage of the assumption that the stars used for this analysis are local, i.e. $R-R_{0}$ is small, and the distance $d$ to the star is smaller than $R$ or $R_{0}$, and we take:

$R-R_{0}=-d \cdot \cos\left(l\right)$.

So:

$$\begin{align}
& V_{\text{obs, r}}=-R_{0}\frac{d\Omega}{dr}\Bigg\vert_{R_{0}}d \cdot \cos\left(l\right)\sin\left(l\right) \\
& V_{\text{obs, t}}=-R_{0}\frac{d\Omega}{dr}\Bigg\vert_{R_{0}}d \cdot \cos^{2}\left(l\right)-\Omega d \\
\end{align}$$

Using the sine and cosine half angle formulae, these velocities may be rewritten as:

$$\begin{align}
& V_{\text{obs, r}}=-R_{0}\frac{d\Omega}{dr}\Bigg\vert_{R_{0}}d\frac{\sin\left(2l\right)}{2} \\
& V_{\text{obs, t}}=-R_{0}\frac{d\Omega}{dr}\Bigg\vert_{R_{0}}d\frac{\left(\cos\left(2l\right)+1\right)}{2}-\Omega d=-R_{0}\frac{d\Omega}{dr}\Bigg\vert_{R_{0}}d\frac{\cos\left(2l\right)}{2}+\left(-\frac{1}{2}R_{0}\frac{d\Omega}{dr}\Bigg\vert_{R_{0}}-\Omega\right)d \\
\end{align}$$

Writing the velocities in terms of our known quantities and two coefficients $A$ and $B$ yields:

$$\begin{align}
& V_{\text{obs, r}}=Ad\sin\left(2l\right) \\
& V_{\text{obs, t}}=Ad\cos\left(2l\right)+Bd \\
\end{align}$$

where

$$\begin{align}
& A=-\frac{1}{2}R_{0}\frac{d\Omega}{dr}\Bigg\vert_{R_{0}} \\
& B=-\frac{1}{2}R_{0}\frac{d\Omega}{dr}\Bigg\vert_{R_{0}}-\Omega \\
\end{align}$$

At this stage, the observable velocities are related to these coefficients and the position of the star. It is now possible to relate these coefficients to the rotation properties of the galaxy. For a star in a circular orbit, we can express the derivative of the angular velocity with respect to radius in terms of the rotation velocity and radius and evaluate this at the location of the Sun:

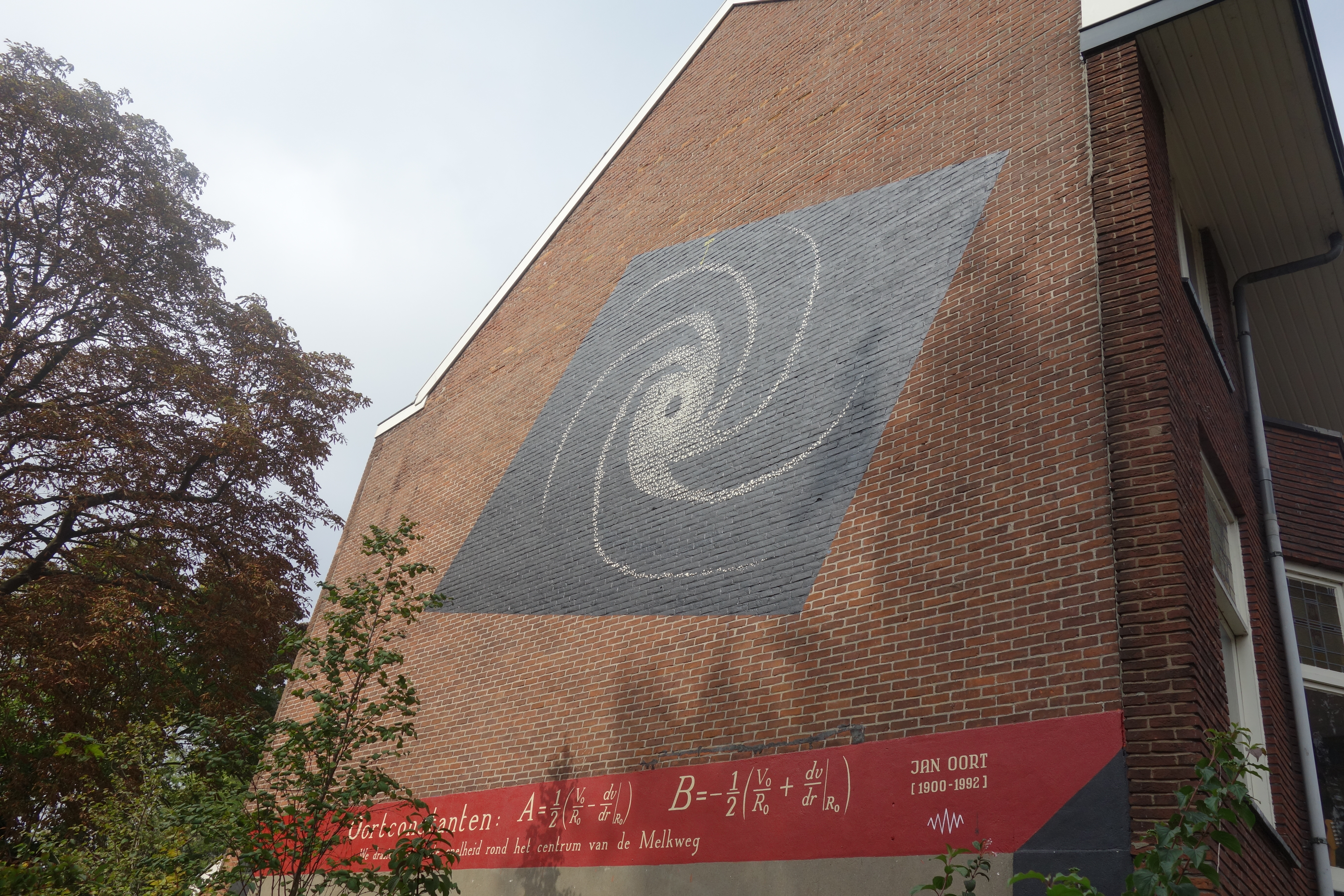
Oort constants on a wall in Leiden, across a canal from the Leiden Observatory where Oort worked

$$\begin{align}
& \Omega=\frac{v}{r} \\
& \frac{d\Omega}{dr}\Bigg\vert_{R_{0}}=\frac{d(v/r)}{dr}\Bigg\vert_{R_{0}}=-\frac{V_{0}}{R_{0}^{2}}+\frac{1}{R_{0}}\frac{dv}{dr}\Bigg\vert_{R_{0}} \\
\end{align}$$

so

$$\begin{align}
& A=\frac{1}{2}\left(\frac{V_{0}}{R_{0}}-\frac{dv}{dr}\Bigg\vert_{R_{0}}\right) \\
& B=-\frac{1}{2}\left(\frac{V_{0}}{R_{0}}+\frac{dv}{dr}\Bigg\vert_{R_{0}}\right) \\
\end{align}$$

$A$ is the Oort constant describing the shearing motion and $B$ is the Oort constant describing the rotation of the Galaxy. As described below, one can measure $A$ and $B$ from plotting these velocities, measured for many stars, against the galactic longitudes of these stars.

== Measurements ==
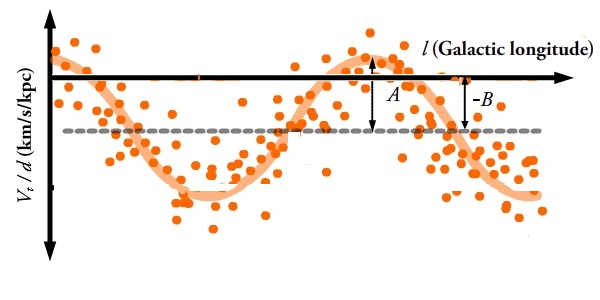
Figure 2: Measuring the Oort constants by fitting to large data sets.

As mentioned in an intermediate step in the derivation above:

$$\begin{align}
& V_{\text{obs, r}}=A\,d\,\sin\left(2l\right) \\
& V_{\text{obs, t}}=A\,d\,\cos\left(2l\right)+B\,d \\
\end{align}$$

Therefore, we can write the Oort constants $A$ and $B$ as:

$$\begin{align}
& A=\frac{V_{\text{obs, r}}}{d\,\sin\left(2l\right)} \\
& B=\frac{V_{\text{obs, t}}}{d}-A\,\cos\left(2l\right) \\
\end{align}$$

Thus, the Oort constants can be expressed in terms of the radial and transverse velocities, distances, and galactic longitudes of objects in our galaxy - all of which are, in principle, observable quantities.

However, there are a number of complications. The simple derivation above assumed that both the Sun and the object in question are traveling on circular orbits about the Galactic center. This is not true for the Sun (the Sun's velocity relative to the local standard of rest is approximately 13.4 km/s), and not necessarily true for other objects in the Milky Way either. The derivation also implicitly assumes that the gravitational potential of the Milky Way is axisymmetric and always directed towards the center. This ignores the effects of spiral arms and the Galaxy's bar. Finally, both transverse velocity and distance are notoriously difficult to measure for objects which are not relatively nearby.

Since the non-circular component of the Sun's velocity is known, it can be subtracted out from our observations to compensate. We do not know, however, the non-circular components of the velocity of each individual star we observe, so they cannot be compensated for in this way. But, if we plot transverse velocity divided by distance against galactic longitude for a large sample of stars, we know from the equations above that they will follow a sine function. The non-circular velocities will introduce scatter around this line, but with a large enough sample the true function can be fit for and the values of the Oort constants measured, as shown in figure 2. $A$ is simply the amplitude of the sinusoid and $B$ is the vertical offset from zero. Measuring transverse velocities and distances accurately and without biases remains challenging, though, and sets of derived values for $A$ and $B$ frequently disagree.

Most methods of measuring $A$ and $B$ are fundamentally similar, following the above patterns. The major differences usually lie in what sorts of objects are used and details of how distance or proper motion are measured. Oort, in his original 1927 paper deriving the constants, obtained $A$ = 31.0 ± 3.7 km s^{−1} kpc^{−1}. He did not explicitly obtain a value for $B$, but from his conclusion that the Galaxy was nearly in Keplerian rotation (as in example 2 below), we can presume he would have gotten a value of around −10 km s^{−1} kpc^{−1}. These differ significantly from modern values, which is indicative of the difficulty of measuring these constants. Measurements of $A$ and $B$ since that time have varied widely; in 1964 the IAU adopted $A$ = 15 km s^{−1} kpc^{−1} and $B$ = −10 km s^{−1} kpc^{−1} as standard values. Although more recent measurements continue to vary, they tend to lie near these values.

The Hipparcos satellite, launched in 1989, was the first space-based astrometric mission, and its precise measurements of parallax and proper motion have enabled much better measurements of the Oort constants. In 1997 Hipparcos data were used to derive the values $A$ = 14.82 ± 0.84 km s^{−1} kpc^{−1} and $B$ = −12.37 ± 0.64 km s^{−1} kpc^{−1}. The Gaia spacecraft, launched in 2013, was an updated successor to Hipparcos; which allowed new and improved levels of accuracy in measuring four Oort constants $A$ = 15.3 ± 0.4 km s^{−1} kpc^{−1}, $B$ = -11.9 ± 0.4 km s^{−1} kpc^{−1}, $C$ = −3.2 ± 0.4 km s^{−1} kpc^{−1} and $K$ = −3.3 ± 0.6 km s^{−1} kpc^{−1}.

With the Gaia values, we find

$$\begin{align}
& \frac{dv}{dr}\Bigg\vert_{R_{0}}=-A-B=-3.4\text{ km/s/kpc} \\
& \frac{V_{0}}{R_{0}}=\Omega=A-B=27.2\text{ km/s/kpc} \\
\end{align}$$

This value of Ω corresponds to a period of 226 million years for the sun's present neighborhood to go around the Milky Way. However, the time it takes for the Sun to go around the Milky Way (a galactic year) may be longer because (in a simple model) it is circulating around a point further from the centre of the galaxy where Ω is smaller (see Sun#Motion).

The values in km s^{−1} kpc^{−1} can be converted into milliarcseconds per year by dividing by 4.740. This gives the following values for the average proper motion of stars in our neighborhood at different galactic longitudes, after correction for the effect due to the Sun's velocity with respect to the local standard of rest:

Galactic longitude	Constellation	average proper motion	mas/year	approximate direction
0°	Sagittarius	B+A	0.7	north-east
45°	Aquila	B	2.5	south-west
90°	Cygnus	B−A	5.7	west
135°	Cassiopeia	B	2.5	west
180°	Auriga	B+A	0.7	south-east
225°	Monoceros	B	2.5	north-west
270°	Vela	B−A	5.7	west
315°	Centaurus	B	2.5	west

The motion of the sun towards the solar apex in Hercules adds a generally westward component to the observed proper motions of stars around Vela or Centaurus and a generally eastward component for stars around Cygnus or Cassiopeia. This effect falls off with distance, so the values in the table are more representative for stars that are further away. On the other hand, more distant stars or objects will not follow the table, which is for objects in our neighborhood. For example, Sagittarius A*, the radio source at the centre of the galaxy, will have a proper motion of approximately Ω or 5.7 mas/y (or ~1.6° per million years) southwestward (with a small adjustment due to the Sun's motion toward the solar apex) even though it is in Sagittarius. Note that these proper motions cannot be measured against "background stars" (because the background stars will have similar proper motions), but must be measured against more stationary references such as quasars.

== Meaning ==
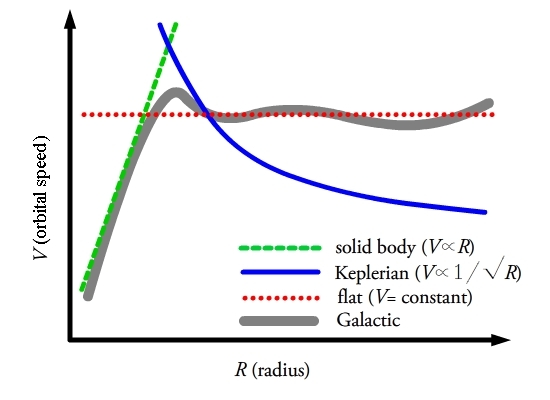
Figure 3: Diagram of the various rotation curves in a galaxy

Galaxy rotation curve for the Milky Way. The vertical axis is the rotation speed about the galactic center. The horizontal axis is the distance from the galactic center. The Sun is marked in yellow. The observed rotation speed curve is marked by data points. The predicted curve based on the stellar mass and gas of the Milky Way is in black. The difference is due to dark matter or possibly a modification of gravity like MOND. The data shown can be found here.

The Oort constants can greatly enlighten one as to how the Galaxy rotates. As one can see $A$ and $B$ are both functions of the Sun's orbital velocity as well as the first derivative of the Sun's velocity. As a result, $A$ describes the shearing motion in the disk surrounding the Sun, while $B$ describes the angular momentum gradient in the solar neighborhood, also referred to as vorticity.

To illuminate this point, one can look at three examples that describe how stars and gas orbit within the Galaxy giving intuition as to the meaning of $A$ and $B$. These three examples are solid body rotation, Keplerian rotation and constant rotation over different annuli. These three types of rotation are plotted as a function of radius ($R$), and are shown in Figure 3 as the green, blue and red curves respectively. The grey curve is approximately the rotation curve of the Milky Way.

=== Solid body rotation ===
To begin, let one assume that the rotation of the Milky Way can be described by solid body rotation, as shown by the green curve in Figure 3. Solid body rotation assumes that the entire system is moving as a rigid body with no differential rotation. This results in a constant angular velocity, $\Omega$, which is independent of $R$. Following this we can see that velocity scales linearly with $R$, $v \propto r$, thus

$$\begin{align}
&\frac{d v}{dr}  =\frac{v}{r}= \Omega \\
\end{align}$$

Using the two Oort constant identities, one then can determine what the $A$ and $B$ constants would be,

$$\begin{align}
& A= \frac{1}{2}\left(\frac{\Omega_{0} R_{0}}{R_{0}}-{\Omega}\Bigg\vert_{R_{0}}\right)=0 \\
& B=-\frac{1}{2}\left(\frac{\Omega_{0}R_{0}}{R_{0}}+{\Omega}\Bigg\vert_{R_{0}}\right)=-\Omega_{0} \\
\end{align}$$

This demonstrates that in solid body rotation, there is no shear motion, i.e. $A=0$, and the vorticity is just the angular rotation, $B=-\Omega$. This is what one would expect because there is no difference in orbital velocity as radius increases, thus no stress between the annuli. Also, in solid body rotation, the only rotation is about the center, so it is reasonable that the resulting vorticity in the system is described by the only rotation in the system. One can actually measure and find that is non-zero ($A=14$ km s^{−1} kpc^{−1}.). Thus the galaxy does not rotate as a solid body in our local neighborhood, but may in the inner regions of the Galaxy.

=== Keplerian rotation ===
The second illuminating example is to assume that the orbits in the local neighborhood follow a Keplerian orbit, as shown by the blue line in Figure 3. The orbital motion in a Keplerian orbit is described by,

$$v=\sqrt{ \frac{G M}{r} } ,$$

where $G$ is the gravitational constant, and $M$ is the mass enclosed within radius $r$. The derivative of the velocity with respect to the radius is,

$$\frac{d v}{dr}  = -\frac{1}{2} \sqrt{ \frac{G M}{R^3} }=-\frac{1}{2} \frac{v}{r}$$

The Oort constants can then be written as follows,

$$\begin{align}
& A= \frac{1}{2}\left(\frac{V_{0}}{R_{0}}+\frac{v}{2r}\Bigg\vert_{R_{0}}\right)= \frac{3V_{0}}{4R_{0}} \\
& B=-\frac{1}{2}\left(\frac{V_{0}}{R_{0}}-\frac{v}{2r}\Bigg\vert_{R_{0}}\right)=-\frac{1V_{0}}{4R_{0}} \\
\end{align}$$

For values of Solar velocity, $V_{0}=218$ km/s, and radius to the Galactic Center, $R_{0}=8$ kpc, the Oort's constants are $A= 20$ km s^{−1} kpc^{−1}, and $B=-7$ km s^{−1} kpc^{−1}. However, the observed values are $A=14$ km s^{−1} kpc^{−1} and $B = -12$ km s^{−1} kpc^{−1}. Thus, Keplerian rotation is not the best description the Milky Way rotation. Furthermore, although this example does not describe the local rotation, it can be thought of as the limiting case that describes the minimum velocity an object can have in a stable orbit.

=== Flat rotation curve ===
The final example is to assume that the rotation curve of the Galaxy is flat, i.e. $v$ is constant and independent of radius, $r$. The rotation velocity is in between that of a solid body and of Keplerian rotation, and is the red dottedline in Figure 3. With a constant velocity, it follows that the radial derivative of $v$ is 0,

$$\frac{dv}{dr}=0$$

and therefore the Oort constants are,

$$\begin{align}
& A=\frac{1}{2}\left(\frac{V_{0}}{R_{0}}-0\Bigg\vert_{R_{0}}\right)=\frac{1}{2}\left(\frac{V_{0}}{R_{0}}\right) \\
& B=-\frac{1}{2}\left(\frac{V_{0}}{R_{0}}+0\Bigg\vert_{R_{0}}\right)=-\frac{1}{2}\left(\frac{V_{0}}{R_{0}}\right) \\
\end{align}$$

Using the local velocity and radius given in the last example, one finds $A= 13.6$ km s^{−1} kpc^{−1} and $B=-13.6$ km s^{−1} kpc^{−1}. This is close to the actual measured Oort constants and tells us that the constant-speed model is the closest of these three to reality in the solar neighborhood. But in fact, as mentioned above, $-A-B$ is negative, meaning that at our distance, speed decreases with distance from the centre of the galaxy.

What one should take away from these three examples, is that with a remarkably simple model, the rotation of the Milky Way can be described by these two constants. The second example is a constraint to the Galactic rotation, giving the fastest decrease with radius. The flat rotation curve serves as an intermediate step between the two rotation curves, and in fact gives the best Oort constants as compared to current measurements.

== Uses ==
One of the major uses of the Oort constants is to calibrate the galactic rotation curve. A relative curve can be derived from studying the motions of gas clouds in the Milky Way, but to calibrate the actual absolute speeds involved requires knowledge of V_{0}. We know that:

$$V_0 = R_0(A-B)\,\!$$

Since R_{0} can be determined by other means (such as by carefully tracking the motions of stars near the Milky Way's central supermassive black hole), knowing $A$ and $B$ allows us to determine V_{0}.

The gravitational attraction toward the galaxy center at our distance is given by

$$R_0\Omega^2=R_0(A-B)^2.$$

The derivative of this with respect to R, which is important in determining the trajectory of a star, is

$$\Omega^2+2R_0\Omega\frac{d\Omega}{dr}\Bigg\vert_{R_{0}}=\Omega(\Omega-4A)=-(A-B)(3A+B).$$

The Oort constants are useful to constrain mass distribution models for the Galaxy. Also, in the epicyclic approximation for elliptical stellar orbits in a disk, the epicyclic frequency $\kappa$ is given by $\kappa^2 = -4B\Omega$, where $\Omega$ is the angular velocity. Therefore, the Oort constants can tell us a great deal about motions in the galaxy.

== See also ==
- Differential rotation
- Milky Way
- Galaxy rotation curve
- Vorticity
