= Claude Ambrose Rogers =

British mathematician (1920–2005)

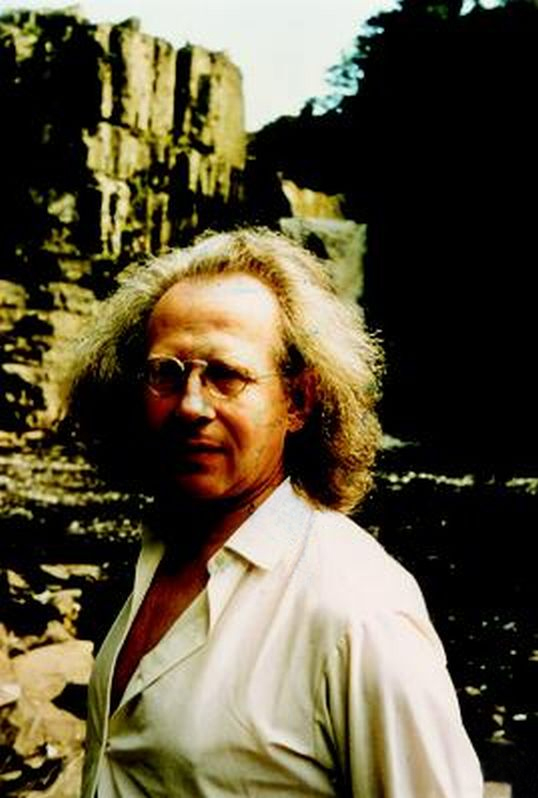
- Claude Ambrose Rogers in 1976
- Born: 1 November 1920
- Died: 5 December 2005 (aged 85)
- Spouse: Joan North
- Awards: FRS, De Morgan Medal
- Scientific career
- Thesis: The Transformation of Sequences by Matrices (1949)
- Doctoral advisor: Lancelot Stephen Bosanquet

Claude Ambrose Rogers FRS (1 November 1920 – 5 December 2005) was an English mathematician who worked in analysis and geometry.

== Research ==
Much of the work of Rogers concerns the geometry of numbers, Hausdorff measures, analytic sets, geometry of Banach spaces, selection theorems and finite-dimensional convex geometry. In the theory of Banach spaces and summability, he proved the Dvoretzky–Rogers lemma and the Dvoretzky–Rogers theorem, both with Aryeh Dvoretzky. He constructed a counterexample to a conjecture related to the Busemann–Petty problem. In the geometry of numbers, the Rogers bound is a bound for dense packings of spheres.

In 2002 he coauthored the book Selectors with John E. Jayne published by Princeton University Press.

== Awards and honours ==
Rogers was elected a Fellow of the Royal Society (FRS) in 1959. He won the London Mathematical Society's De Morgan Medal in 1977.

== Personal life ==
Rogers was married to children's writer Joan North. They had two daughters, Jane and Petra.
