= 1691 Oort =

Rare-type carbonaceous Themistian asteroid

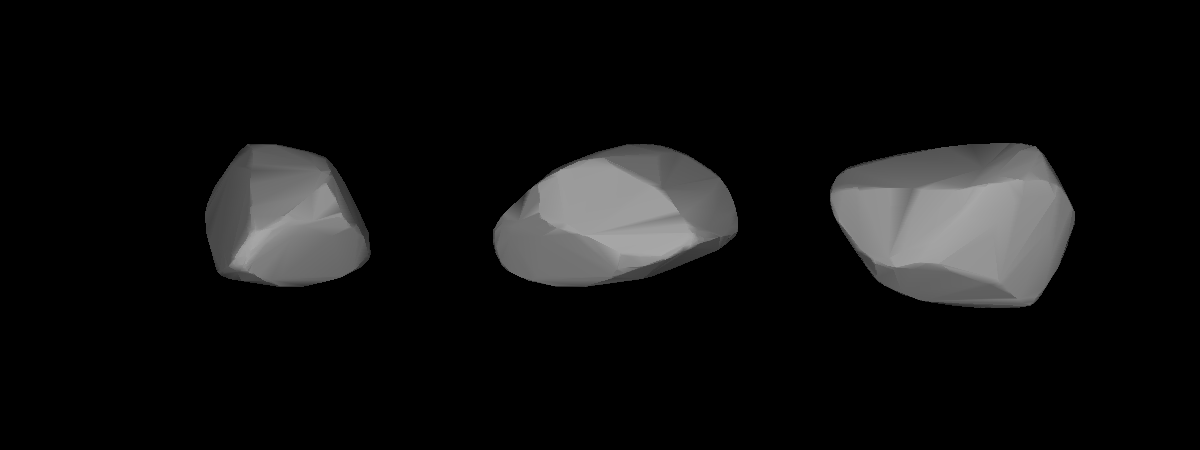
- Lightcurve-based 3D-model of Oort

Discovery
- Discovered by: K. Reinmuth; I. Groeneveld
- Discovery site: Heidelberg Obs.
- Discovery date: 9 September 1956

Designations
- Named after: Jan Oort (astronomer)
- Alternative designations: 1956 RB · 1945 TD; 1947 DA · 1950 PZ; 1950 RU · 1951 XW; 1955 MW · 1956 SD; 1964 DA · A917 TD
- Minor planet category: main-belt · Themis

Orbital characteristics
- Epoch 4 September 2017 (JD 2458000.5)
- Uncertainty parameter 0
- Observation arc: 71.42 yr (26,086 days)
- Aphelion: 3.7153 AU
- Perihelion: 2.6084 AU
- Semi-major axis: 3.1618 AU
- Eccentricity: 0.1750
- Orbital period (sidereal): 5.62 yr (2,054 days)
- Mean anomaly: 240.25°
- Inclination: 1.0860°
- Longitude of ascending node: 174.55°
- Argument of perihelion: 232.69°

Physical characteristics
- Dimensions: 27.13 km (calculated); 33.163±0.534 km 33.644±0.267; 37.37±0.74 km
- Synodic rotation period: 10.2684±0.0005 h 10.2705±0.0004 h
- Geometric albedo: 0.053±0.002; 0.065±0.011; 0.0672±0.0150; 0.10 (assumed)
- Spectral type: Tholen = CU · CU; B–V = 0.682; U–B = 0.316
- Absolute magnitude (H): 10.90±0.12 · 10.95

1691 Oort, provisional designation 1956 RB, is a rare-type carbonaceous Themistian asteroid from the outer region of the asteroid belt, approximately 33 kilometers in diameter.

It was discovered on 9 September 1956, by German astronomer Karl Reinmuth and Dutch astronomer Ingrid van Houten-Groeneveld at Heidelberg Observatory in south-west Germany. It was later named after Dutch astronomer Jan Oort.

== Orbit and classification ==
is a member of the Themis family, a dynamical family of outer-belt asteroids with nearly coplanar ecliptical orbits. Oort orbits the Sun at a distance of 2.6–3.7 AU once every 5 years and 7 months (2,054 days). Its orbit has an eccentricity of 0.18 and an inclination of 1° with respect to the ecliptic.

It was first identified as 1945 TD at Turku in 1945, extending body's observation arc by 14 years prior to its official discovery observation. Information about an earlier 1917-identification, A917 TD, is not available.

== Physical characteristics ==
The dark C-type asteroid, classified as a rare intermediate CU-type in the Tholen taxonomy.

=== Rotation period ===
In February 2009, a rotational lightcurve of Oort was obtained from photometric observations taken by French amateur astronomer René Roy. It gave a well-defined rotation period of 10.2705 hours with a brightness variation of 0.38 magnitude (U=3). An international study from 2013, published a concurring, modeled period of 10.2684 hours (n.a.).

=== Diameter and albedo ===
According to the surveys carried out by the Japanese Akari satellite and NASA's Wide-field Infrared Survey Explorer with its subsequent NEOWISE mission, Oort measures 33.64 and 37.37 kilometers in diameter, and its surface has an albedo of 0.065 and 0.053, respectively. The Collaborative Asteroid Lightcurve Link assumes an albedo of 0.10 and calculates a diameter of 27.13 kilometers with an absolute magnitude of 10.95.

== Naming ==
This minor planet was named in honor of Dutch astronomer Jan Oort (1900–1992), director of the Leiden Observatory (1945–1970), president of the International Astronomical Union (1958–1961), and a well-known authority on stellar statistics and galactic structure.

He overturned the idea that the Sun was at the center of the Milky Way. The Oort cloud, the outermost gravitationally bound region of the Solar System, was also named after him. The official naming citation was published by the Minor Planet Center on 15 February 1970 (M.P.C. 3023).
