= Jan Oort =

Dutch astronomer (1900–1992)

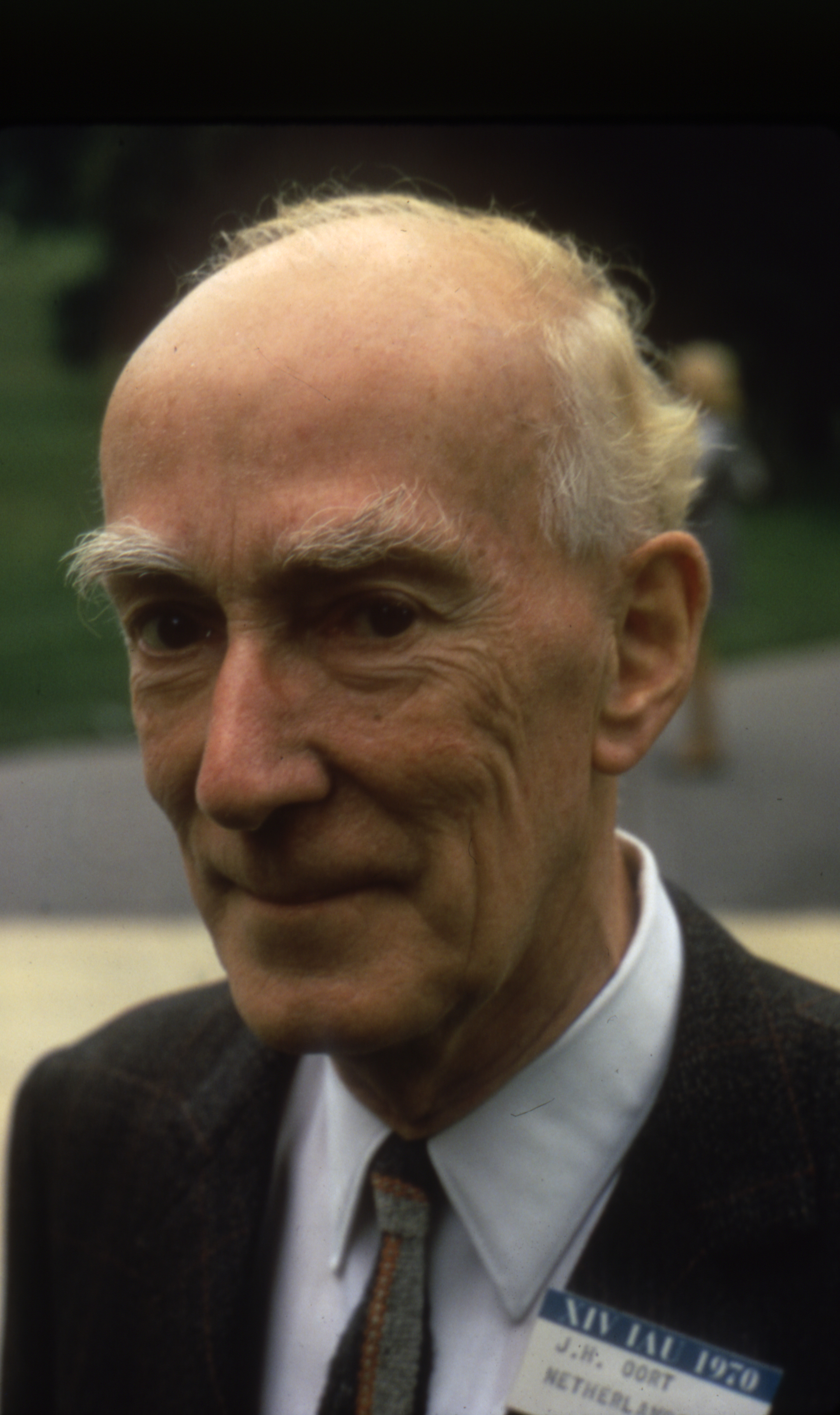
- Oort in 1970
- Born: Jan Hendrik Oort; 28 April 1900; Franeker, Friesland, Netherlands
- Died: 5 November 1992 (aged 92); Leiden, South Holland, Netherlands
- Known for: Oort cloud; Dark matter; Oort constants
- Awards: Prix Jules Janssen(1947); Vetlesen Prize (1966); Kyoto Prize (1987)
- Scientific career
- Fields: Astronomy
- Doctoral advisor: Jacobus Cornelius Kapteyn

Jan Hendrik Oort ForMemRS (/ˈɔːrt/ or /ˈʊərt/; 28 April 1900 – 5 November 1992) was a Dutch astronomer who made significant contributions to the understanding of the Milky Way and who was a pioneer in the field of radio astronomy. The New York Times called him "one of the century's foremost explorers of the universe"; the European Space Agency website describes him as "one of the greatest astronomers of the 20th century" and states that he "revolutionised astronomy through his ground-breaking discoveries." In 1955, Oort's name appeared in Life magazine's list of the 100 most famous living people. He has been described as "putting the Netherlands in the forefront of postwar astronomy".

Oort determined that the Milky Way rotates and overturned the idea that the Sun was at its center. He also analyzed the vertical motions of stars near the Sun, using this data to estimate the local gravitational field. He calculated how much mass must be present to account for the stellar motions perpendicular to the Galactic plane. Comparing this mass to the visible stars and gas, in 1932, he wrote, "This leads to the conclusion that there must be considerable amounts of invisible matter." The following year, Fritz Zwicky called this invisible matter “dunkle Materie”, German for dark matter. It is now believed that dark matter makes up approximately 84.5% of the total mass in the Universe, and its gravitational pull is responsible for "the clustering of stars into galaxies and galaxies into connecting strings of galaxies". However, Oort's data have been challenged and his discovery may have been spurious.

Oort discovered the galactic halo, a group of stars orbiting the Milky Way but outside the main disk. Additionally Oort is responsible for a number of important insights about comets, including the realization that their orbits "implied there was a lot more solar system than the region occupied by the planets."

The Oort cloud, the Oort constants, Oort Limit, an impact crater on Pluto (Oort), and the asteroid 1691 Oort were all named after him.

== Early life and education ==
Oort was born in Franeker, a small town in the Dutch province of Friesland, on April 28, 1900. He was the second son of Abraham Hermanus Oort, a physician, who died on May 12, 1941, and Ruth Hannah Faber, who was the daughter of Jan Faber and Henrietta Sophia Susanna Schaaii, and who died on November 20, 1957. Both of his parents came from families of clergymen, with his paternal grandfather, a Protestant clergyman with liberal ideas, who "was one of the founders of the more liberal Church in Holland" and who "was one of the three people who made a new translation of the Bible into Dutch." The reference is to Henricus Oort (1836–1927), who was the grandson of a famous Rotterdam preacher and, through his mother, Dina Maria Blom, the grandson of theologian Abraham Hermanus Blom, a "pioneer of modern biblical research". Several of Oort's uncles were pastors, as was his maternal grandfather. "My mother kept up her interests in that, at least in the early years of her marriage", he recalled. "But my father was less interested in Church matters."

In 1903 Oort's parents moved to Oegstgeest, near Leiden, where his father took charge of the Endegeest Psychiatric Clinic. Oort's father, "was a medical director in a sanitorium for nervous illnesses. We lived in the director's house of the sanitorium, in a small forest which was very nice for the children, of course, to grow up in." Oort's younger brother, John, became a professor of plant diseases at the University of Wageningen. In addition to John, Oort had two younger sisters and an elder brother who died of diabetes when he was a student.

Oort attended primary school in Oegstgeest and secondary school in Leiden, and in 1917 went to Groningen University to study physics. He later said that he had become interested in science and astronomy during his high-school years, and conjectured that his interest was stimulated by reading Jules Verne. His one hesitation about studying pure science was the concern that it "might alienate one a bit from people in general", as a result of which "one might not develop the human factor sufficiently." But he overcame this concern and ended up discovering that his later academic positions, which involved considerable administrative responsibilities, afforded a good deal of opportunity for social contact.

Oort chose Groningen partly because a well known astronomer, Jacobus Cornelius Kapteyn, was teaching there, although Oort was unsure whether he wanted to specialize in physics or astronomy. After studying with Kapteyn, Oort decided on astronomy. "It was the personality of Professor Kapteyn which decided me entirely", he later recalled. "He was quite an inspiring teacher and especially his elementary astronomy lectures were fascinating." Oort began working on research with Kapteyn early in his third year. According to Oort one professor at Groningen who had considerable influence on his education was physicist Frits Zernike.

After taking his final exam in 1921, Oort was appointed assistant at Groningen, but in September 1922, he went to the United States to do graduate work at Yale and to serve as an assistant to Frank Schlesinger of the Yale Observatory.

== Career ==
At Yale, Oort was responsible for making observations with the Observatory's zenith telescope. "I worked on the problem of latitude variation", he later recalled, "which is quite far away from the subjects I had so far been studying." He later considered his experience at Yale useful as he became interested in "problems of fundamental astronomy that [he] felt was capitalized on later, and which certainly influenced [his] future lectures in Leiden." Personally, he "felt somewhat lonesome in Yale", but also said that "some of my very best friends were made in these years in New Haven."

=== Early discoveries ===
In 1924, Oort returned to the Netherlands to work at Leiden University, where he served as a research assistant, becoming Conservator in 1926, Lecturer in 1930, and Professor Extraordinary in 1935. In 1926, he received his doctorate from Groningen with a thesis on the properties of high-velocity stars. The next year, Swedish astronomer Bertil Lindblad proposed that the rate of rotation of stars in the outer part of the galaxy decreased with distance from the galactic core, and Oort, who later said that he believed it was his colleague Willem de Sitter who had first drawn his attention to Lindblad's work, realized that Lindblad was correct and that the truth of his proposition could be demonstrated observationally. Oort provided two formulae that described galactic rotation in the solar neighborhood; the two constants that figured in these formulae are now known as "Oort's constants". Oort "argued that just as the outer planets appear to us to be overtaken and passed by the less distant ones in the solar system, so too with the stars if the Galaxy really rotated", according to the Oxford Dictionary of Scientists. He "was finally able to calculate, on the basis of the various stellar motions, that the Sun was some 30,000 light-years from the center of the Galaxy and took about 225 million years to complete its orbit. He also showed that stars lying in the outer regions of the galactic disk rotated more slowly than those nearer the center. The Galaxy does not therefore rotate as a uniform whole but exhibits what is known as 'differential rotation'."

These early discoveries by Oort about the Milky Way overthrew the Kapteyn system, named after his mentor, which had envisioned a galaxy that was symmetrical around the Sun. As Oort later noted, "Kapteyn and his co-workers had not realized that the absorption in the galactic plane was as bad as it turned out to be." Until Oort began his work, he later recalled, "the Leiden Observatory had been concentrating entirely on positional astronomy, meridian circle work and some proper motion work. But no astrophysics or anything that looked like that. No structure of the galaxy, no dynamics of the galaxy. There was no one else in Leiden who was interested in these problems in which I was principally interested, so the first years I worked more or less by myself in these projects. De Sitter was interested, but his main line of research was celestial mechanics; at that time the expanding universe had moved away from his direct interest." As the European Space Agency states, Oort "sh[ook] the scientific world by demonstrating that the Milky Way rotates like a giant 'Catherine Wheel'." He showed that all the stars in the galaxy were "travelling independently through space, with those nearer the center rotating much faster than those further away."

This breakthrough made Oort famous in the world of astronomy. In the early 1930s he received job offers from Harvard and Columbia University, but chose to stay at Leiden, although he did spend half of 1932 at the Perkins Observatory, in Delaware, Ohio.

In 1934, Oort became assistant to the director of Leiden Observatory; the next year he became General Secretary of the International Astronomical Union (IAU), a post he held until 1948; in 1937 he was elected to the Royal Academy. In 1939, he spent half a year in the U.S., and became interested in the Crab Nebula, concluding in a paper, written with American astronomer Nicholas Mayall, that it was the result of a supernova explosion.

=== Nazi invasion of Netherlands ===
In 1940, Nazi Germany invaded the Netherlands. Soon after, the occupying regime dismissed all Jewish professors from Leiden University and other universities. "Among the professors who were dismissed", Oort later recalled, "was a very famous … professor of law by the name of Meyers. On the day when he got the letter from the authorities that he could no longer teach his classes, the dean of the faculty of law went into his class … and delivered a speech in which he started by saying, 'I won't talk about his dismissal and I shall leave the people who did this, below us, but will concentrate on the greatness of the man dismissed by our aggressors.'"

This speech (26 November 1940) made such an impression on all his students that on leaving the auditorium they defiantly sang the anthem of the Netherlands and went on strike. Oort was present for the lecture and was greatly impressed. This occasion formed the beginning of the active resistance in Holland. The speech by Rudolph Cleveringa, the dean of the faculty of Law and former graduate student of professor Meijers, was widely circulated during the rest of the war by the resistance groups. Oort was in a little group of professors in Leiden who came together regularly and discussed the problems the university faced in view of the German occupation. Most of the members of this group were put in hostage camps soon after the speech by Cleveringa. Oort refused to collaborate with the occupiers, "and so we went down to live in the country for the rest of the war." Resigning from the Royal Academy, from his professorial post at Leiden, and from his position at the Observatory, Oort took his family to Hulshorst, a quiet village in the province of Gelderland, where they sat out the war. In Hulshorst, he began writing a book on stellar dynamics.

=== Oort's radio astronomy ===
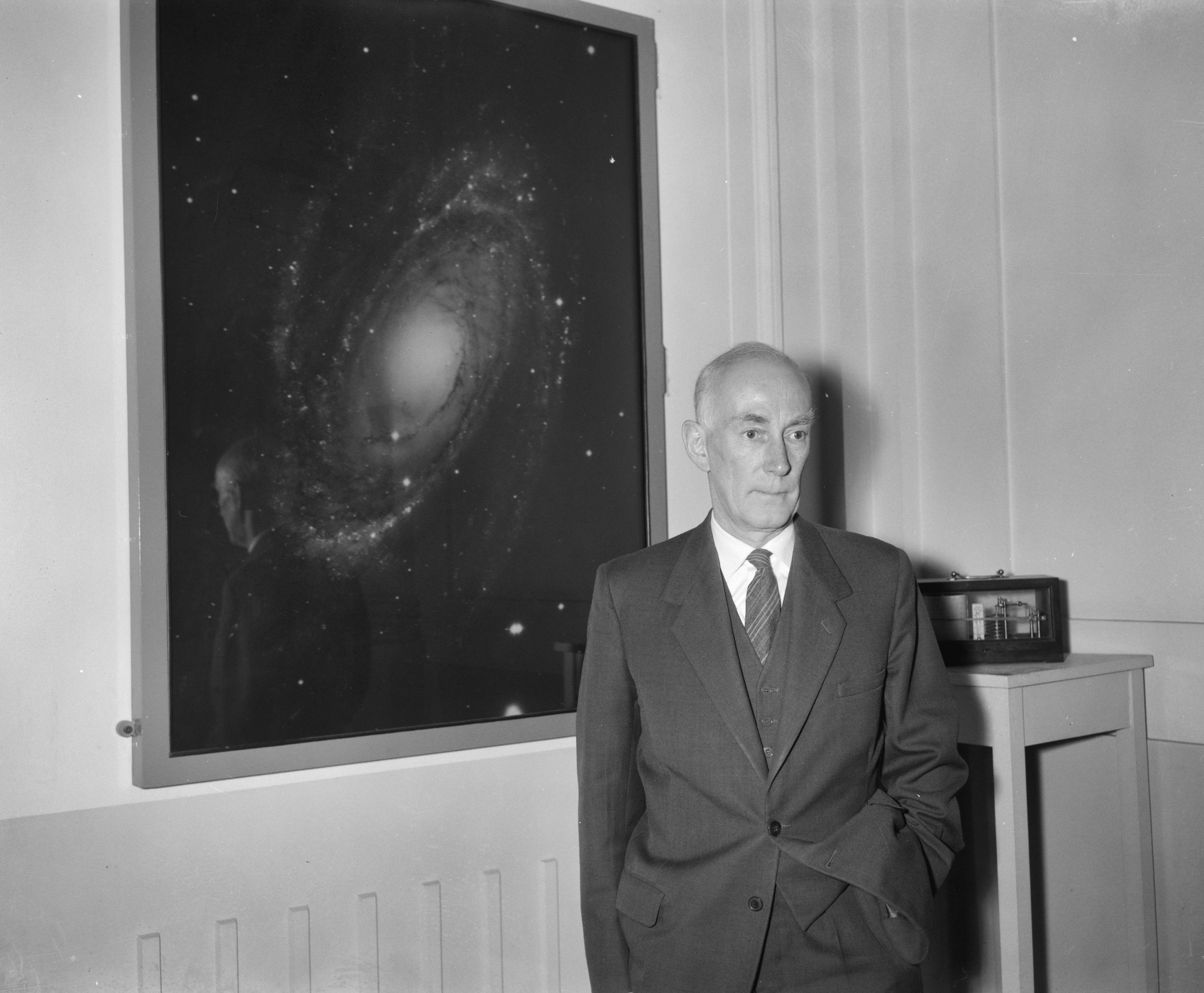
Oort by an image of the galaxy Messier 81.

Before the war was over, he initiated, in collaboration with a Utrecht University student, Hendrik van de Hulst, a project that eventually succeeded, in 1951, in detecting the 21-centimeter radio emission from interstellar hydrogen spectral line at radio frequencies. Oort and his colleagues also made the first investigation of the central region of the Galaxy, and discovered that "the 21-centimeter radio emission passed un-absorbed through the gas clouds that had hidden the center from optical observation. They found a huge concentration of mass there, later identified as mainly stars, and also discovered that much of the gas in the region was moving rapidly outward away from the center." In June 1945, after the end of the war, Oort returned to Leiden, took over as director of the Observatory, and became Full Professor of Astronomy. During this immediate postwar period, he led the Dutch group that built radio telescopes at Radio Kootwijk, Dwingeloo, and Westerbork and used the 21-centimeter line to map the Milky Way, including the large-scale spiral structure, the Galactic Center, and gas cloud motions. Oort was helped in this project by the Dutch telecommunications company, PTT, which, he later explained, "had under their care all the radar equipment that was left behind by the Germans on the coast of Holland. This radar equipment consisted in part of reflecting telescopes of 7 1/2 meter aperture.... Our radio astronomy was really started with the aid of one of these instruments… it was in Kootwijk that the first map of the Galaxy was made." For a brief period, before the completion of the Jodrell Bank telescope, the Dwingeloo instrument was the largest of its kind on Earth.

It has been written that "Oort was probably the first astronomer to realize the importance" of radio astronomy. "In the days before radio telescopes," one source notes, "Oort was one of the few scientists to realise the potential significance of using radio waves to search the heavens. His theoretical research suggested that vast clouds of hydrogen lingered in the spiral arms of the Galaxy. These molecular clouds, he predicted, were the birthplaces of stars." These predictions were confirmed by measurements made at the new radio observatories at Dwingeloo and Westerbork. Oort later said that "it was Grote Reber's work which first impressed me and convinced me of the unique importance of radio observations for surveying the galaxy." Just before the war, Reber had published a study of galactic radio emissions. Oort later commented, "The work of Grote Reber made it quite clear [radio astronomy] would be a very important tool for investigating the Galaxy, just because it could investigate the whole disc of the galactic system unimpeded by absorption." Oort's work in radio astronomy is credited by colleagues with putting the Netherlands in the forefront of postwar astronomy. Oort also investigated the source of the light from the Crab Nebula, finding that it was polarized, and probably produced by synchrotron radiation, confirming a hypothesis by Iosif Shklovsky.

=== Comet studies ===
Oort went on to study comets, which he formulated a number of revolutionary hypotheses. He hypothesized that the Solar System is surrounded by a massive cloud consisting of billions of comets, many of them "long-period" comets that originate in a cloud far beyond the orbits of Neptune and Pluto. This cloud is now known as the Oort Cloud. He also realized that these external comets, from beyond Pluto, can "become trapped into tighter orbits by Jupiter, and become periodic comets, like Halley's comet." According to one source, "Oort was one of the few people to have seen Comet Halley on two separate apparitions. At the age of 10, he was with his father on the shore at Noordwijk, Netherlands, when he first saw the comet. In 1986, 76 years later, he went up in a plane and was able to see the famous comet once more."

In 1951 Oort and his wife spent several months in Princeton and Pasadena, an interlude that led to a paper by Oort and Lyman Spitzer on the acceleration of interstellar clouds by O-type stars. He went on to study high-velocity clouds. Oort served as director of the Leiden Observatory until 1970. After his retirement, he wrote comprehensive articles on the galactic center and on superclusters and published several papers on the quasar absorption lines, supporting Yakov Zel'dovich's pancake model of the universe. He also continued researching the Milky Way and other galaxies and their distribution until shortly before his death at 92.

One of Oort's strengths, according to one source, was his ability to "translate abstruse mathematical papers into physical terms," as exemplified by his translation of the difficult mathematical terms of Lindblad's theory of differential galactic rotation into a physical model. Similarly, he "derived the existence of the comet cloud on the outskirts of the Solar System from the observations, using the mathematics needed in dynamics, but then deduced the origin of this cloud using general physical arguments and a minimum of mathematics."

== Personal life ==
In 1927, Oort married Johanna Maria (Mieke) Graadt van Roggen (1906–1993). They had met at a university celebration at Utrecht, where Oort's brother was studying biology at the time. Oort and his wife had two sons, Coenraad (Coen) and Abraham, and a daughter, Marijke. Abraham became a professor of climatology at Princeton University.

According to the website of Leiden University, Oort was very interested in and knowledgeable about art. "[W]hen visiting another country he would always try to take some time off to visit the local museums and exhibitions…and in the fifties served for some years as chairman of the pictorial arts committee of the Leiden Academical Arts Centre, which had among other things the task of organizing expositions".

"Colleagues remembered him as a tall, lean and courtly man with a genial manner," reported his New York Times obituary.

== Honours ==
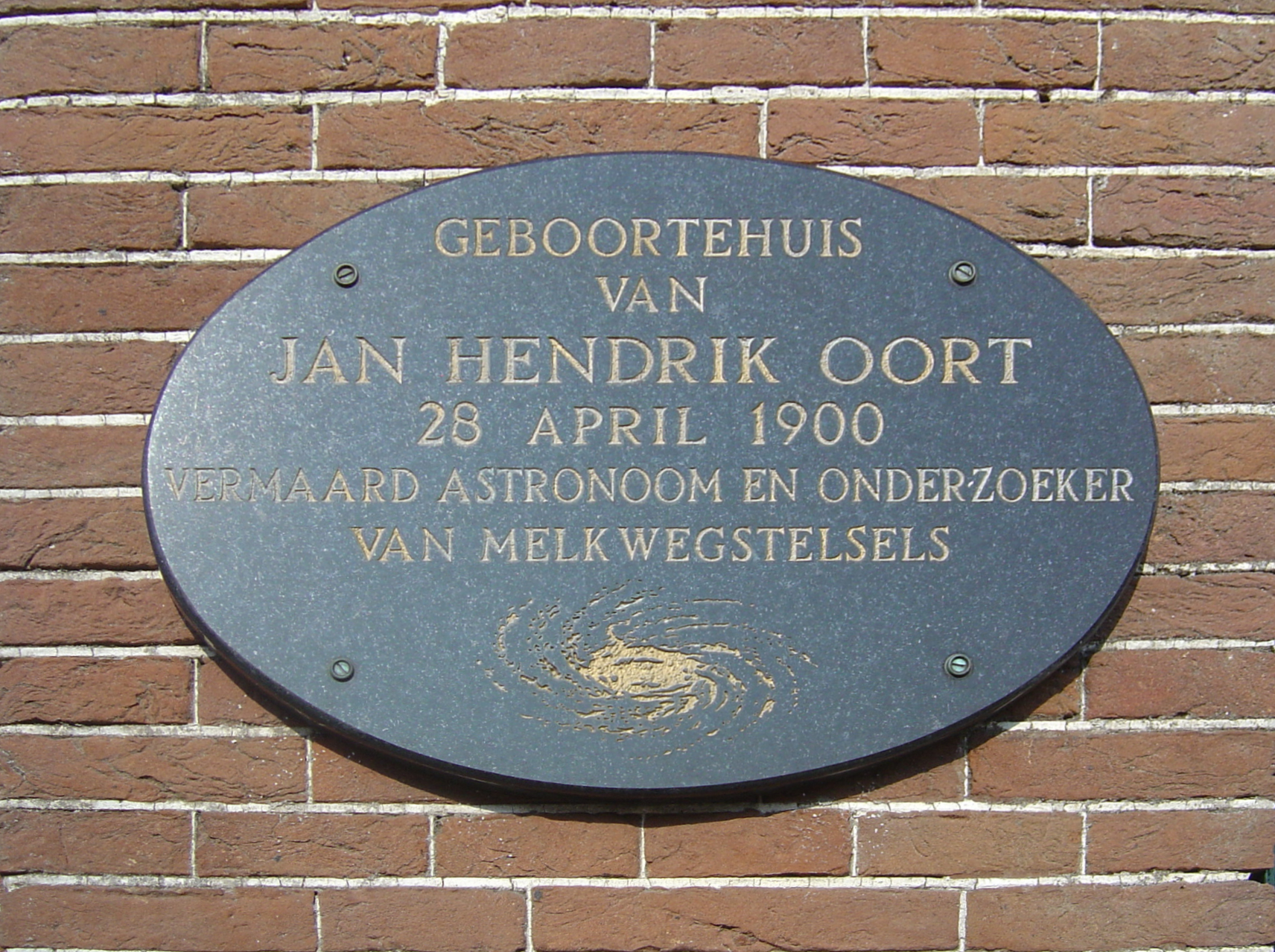
Commemorative plate at the house where Jan Oort was born in Franeker (Zilverstraat 18)

Awards

- Bruce Medal of the Astronomical Society of the Pacific in 1942
- Gold Medal of the Royal Astronomical Society in 1946
- Janssen Medal from the French Academy of Sciences in 1946
- Prix Jules Janssen, the highest award of the Société astronomique de France, the French astronomical society (1947)
- Henry Norris Russell Lectureship of the American Astronomical Society in 1951
- Gouden Ganzenveer in 1960
- Vetlesen Prize in 1966
- National Radio Astronomy Observatory, Jansky Prize, 1967
- Karl Schwarzschild Medal of the Astronomische Gesellschaft in 1972
- Association pour le Développement International de l'Observatoire de Nice, ADION medal, 1978
- Balzan Prize for Astrophysics in 1984
- Inamori Foundation, Kyoto Prize, 1987

Named after him

- 1691 Oort (asteroid)
- Oort cloud (Öpik–Oort cloud)
- Oort limit
- Oort constants
- Oort building, the current building of the Leiden Observatory

Memberships

- Member of the Royal Netherlands Academy of Arts and Sciences (1937–1943, 1945–)
- Member of the American Academy of Arts and Sciences (1946–)
- Member of the United States National Academy of Sciences (1953–)
- Member of the American Philosophical Society (1957–)
- Member of the Société astronomique de France (joined in 1936)

Upon his death, Nobel Prize winning astrophysicist Subrahmanyan Chandrasekhar remarked, "The great oak of Astronomy has been felled, and we are lost without its shadow."
