= Oort limit =

Disputed

The Oort limit is a theoretical location at the outer limits of the Oort cloud, where the amount of comets and minor planets orbiting the Sun drops drastically, or drops entirely. The exact location of such a limit, if there is such one, is uncertain. About 100 comets, of 3500 known comets, come more than 5000 AU from the Sun, and a very few come as far as 20,000 AU from the Sun.

So far, it appears that rather than a sudden drop in the amount of comets orbiting the Sun at about 50,000 AU, the Oort cloud rather uniformly decreases in size, the further away from the Sun it goes. As current observations indicate, the Oort limit is somewhere around 50,000 AU (0.8 LY) from the Sun.

== See also ==
- Kuiper Cliff

== Notes ==
Of these known comets, the majority (>2000) were discovered using the SOHO telescope, and are mostly sungrazing comets from the Kreutz Sungrazers. Of the other comets, about half of them are long-period comets, orbiting several hundred Astronomical Units out or further. Considering this, Oort Cloud comets are fairly common.
