= Cavendish Astrophysics Group =

Telescope operating group at Mullard Radio Astronomy Observatory

The Cavendish Astrophysics Group (formerly the Radio Astronomy Group) is based at the Cavendish Laboratory at the University of Cambridge. The group operates all of the telescopes at the Mullard Radio Astronomy Observatory except for the 32m MERLIN telescope, which is operated by Jodrell Bank.

The group is the second largest of three astronomy departments in the University of Cambridge.

== Instruments under development by the group ==
- The Atacama Large Millimeter Array (ALMA) - several modules of this international project
- The Magdalena Ridge Observatory Interferometer (MRO Interferometer)
- The SKA
- The Radio Experiment for the Analysis of Cosmic Hydrogen (REACH)

== Instruments in service ==
- The Arcminute Microkelvin Imager (AMI)
- A Heterodyne Array Receiver for B-band (HARP-B) at the James Clerk Maxwell Telescope
- The Planck Surveyor

== Previous instruments ==
- The CLOVER telescope
- The Very Small Array
- The 5 km Ryle Telescope
- The Cambridge Optical Aperture Synthesis Telescope (COAST)
- The Cosmic Anisotropy Telescope
- The Cambridge Low Frequency Synthesis Telescope
- The Half-Mile Telescope
- The One-Mile Telescope
- The Interplanetary Scintillation Array which discovered the first pulsar
- The 4C Array which made the 4C catalogue
- The Cambridge Interferometer
- The Long Michelson Interferometer
- Various aperture masking instruments for optical aperture synthesis

== Catalogues published by the group ==
- Preliminary survey of the radio stars in the Northern Hemisphere (sometimes called the 1C catalogue) at 81.5-MHz (unreliable at low flux levels)
- 2C catalogue 81.5-MHz (unreliable at low flux levels)
- 3C catalogue 159 MHz
- 4C catalogue 178 MHz
- 5C catalogue 408 MHz and 1407 MHz
- 6C catalogue 151 MHz
- 7C catalogue 151 MHz
- 8C catalogue 38 MHz
- 9C catalogue 15 GHz
- 10C catalogue 14–18 GHz
- Cambridge Interplanetary Scintillation survey

== Famous Group Members ==
- Sir Martin Ryle, 1918–1984, Nobel Prize for Physics, founder of the group, former British Astronomer Royal
- Tony Hewish, Nobel Prize for Physics, designed the telescope which discovered the first pulsars
- Malcolm Longair Jacksonian Professor of Natural Philosophy, former head of the Cavendish Laboratory
- Jocelyn Bell Burnell, detected the first signal from a pulsar
- John E. Baldwin
- Richard Edwin Hills
- F. Graham Smith - early co-worker with Ryle, later Astronomer Royal
- David Saint-Jacques Canadian astronaut
