= Seventh Cambridge Survey of Radio Sources =

Astronomical survey

Seventh Cambridge Survey

The Seventh Cambridge Survey of radio sources (7C 151-MHz survey) was carried out at the Mullard Radio Astronomy Observatory by the Cavendish Astrophysics Group, using the Cambridge Low-Frequency Synthesis Telescope.

In 2007, the final refinement stage of the 7C survey resulted in a reference catalog, one of a sequence of Cambridge low-frequency radio range catalogs characterizing extra-galactic radio sources.
