= 4C Array =

Radio telescope in Cambridge, England

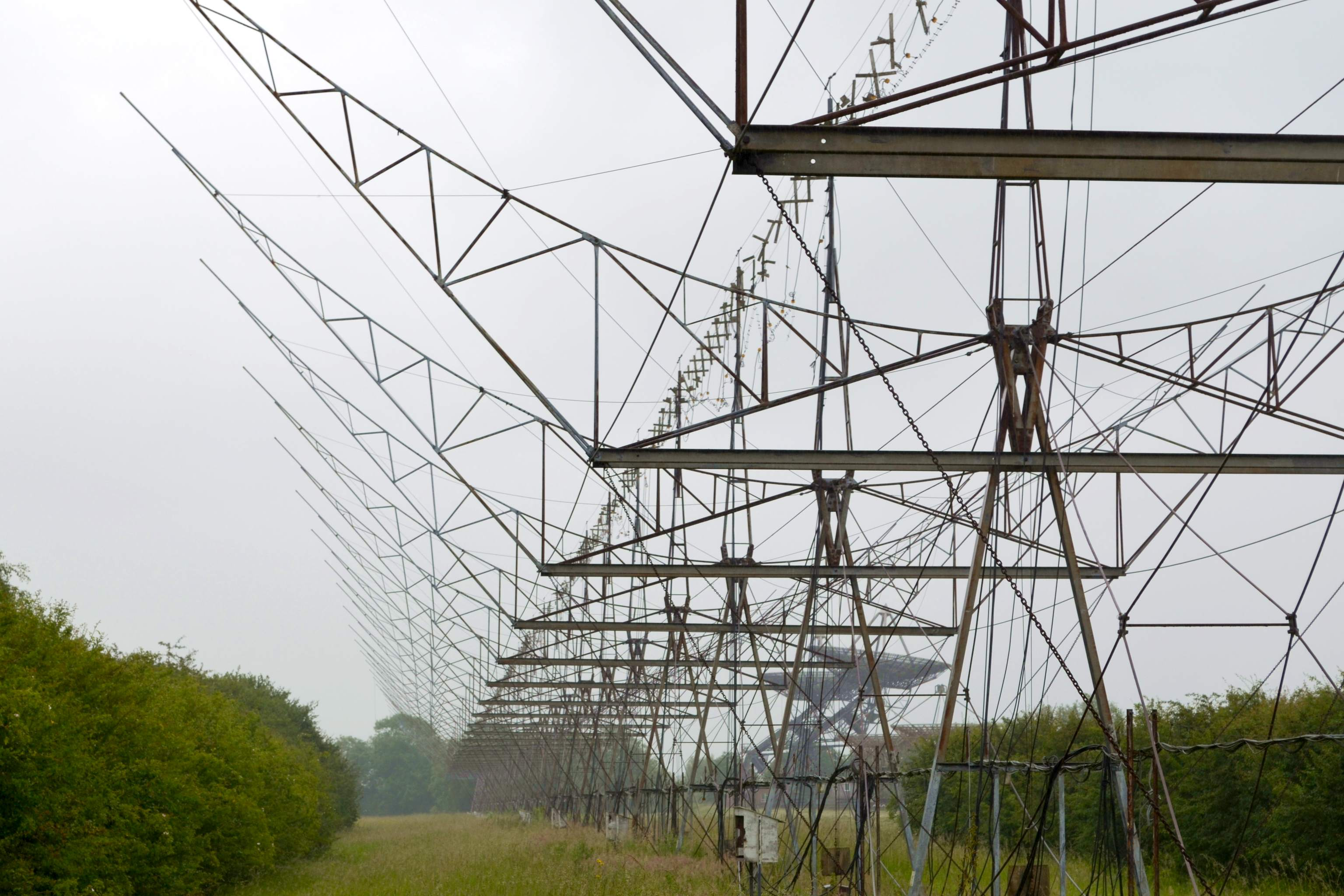
- Detail of the remains of the 4C Array, with antennas of the One-Mile Telescope in the background in June 2014
- Location(s): Cambridge, Cambridgeshire, East of England, England
- Coordinates: 52°09′51″N 0°02′00″E
- Wavelength: 1.7 m (180 MHz)
- Location of 4C Array
- Related media on Commons

The 4C Array is a cylindrical paraboloid radio telescope at the Mullard Radio Astronomy Observatory, near Cambridge, England. It is similar in design to the Molonglo Observatory Synthesis Telescope. It is 450 m long, 20 m wide, with a second, moveable element (now mostly removed; some of it is still visible, beyond COAST). The first large aperture synthesis telescope (1958), it was also the first new instrument to be built at Lord's Bridge, after the Observatory was moved there in 1957, and needed 64 km (40 mi) of reflector wire (since removed). The 4C operated at 178 MHz (1.7 m), and located nearly 5000 sources of the 4C (4th Cambridge) catalogue published in 1965 and 1966, which helped establish the evolution of the radio galaxy population of the universe. The telescope is now inoperable.

It is flanked to the northwest by the Cosmic Anisotropy Telescope enclosure and to the south by the One-Mile and Half-Mile Telescopes.

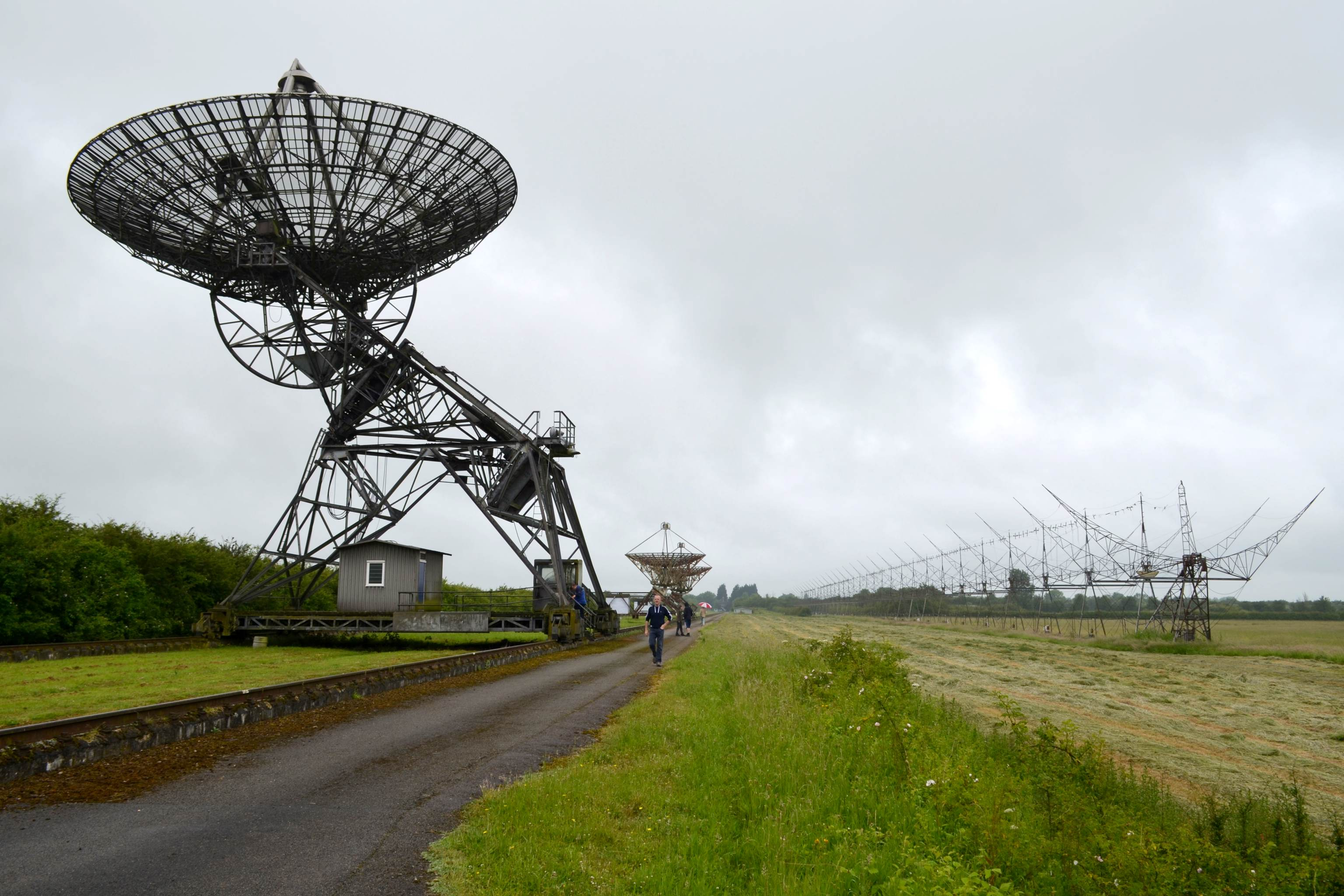
One antenna of the One-Mile Telescope (left), two of the Half-Mile Telescope (centre) and the remains of the 4C Array (right) in June 2014
