= Astronomy departments in the University of Cambridge =

The University of Cambridge has three large astronomy departments as follows:

- The Institute of Astronomy, concentrating on theoretical astrophysics and optical, infrared and X-ray observations.
- The Cavendish Astrophysics Group, concentrating on radio and submillimetre observations and instrumentation, observational cosmology and all aspects of astronomical interferometry, and operating the Mullard Radio Astronomy Observatory.
- The Department of Applied Mathematics and Theoretical Physics and Isaac Newton Institute in the Faculty of Mathematics, include theoretical astrophysics and cosmology amongst other disciplines

There is frequent collaboration between departments as research interests overlap.

The Kavli Institute for Cosmology at Cambridge (KICC) is operated jointly by the first two departments, with close connections to the third. It is located on the same site as the Institute of Astronomy. In 2013 the Cavendish Astrophysics group relocated to a new building, the Battcock Centre for Experimental Astrophysics, on the same site to foster further collaboration and integration.

== History ==
Although Astronomy has been taught at the University of Cambridge since medieval times, the departmental structure has changed frequently, and all three of departments listed above were founded within the last two centuries.

The first astronomical observatory at the University of Cambridge was built at the top of Trinity College gatehouse in 1704.
