= PSR B1919+21 =

Pulsar in the constellation Vulpecula

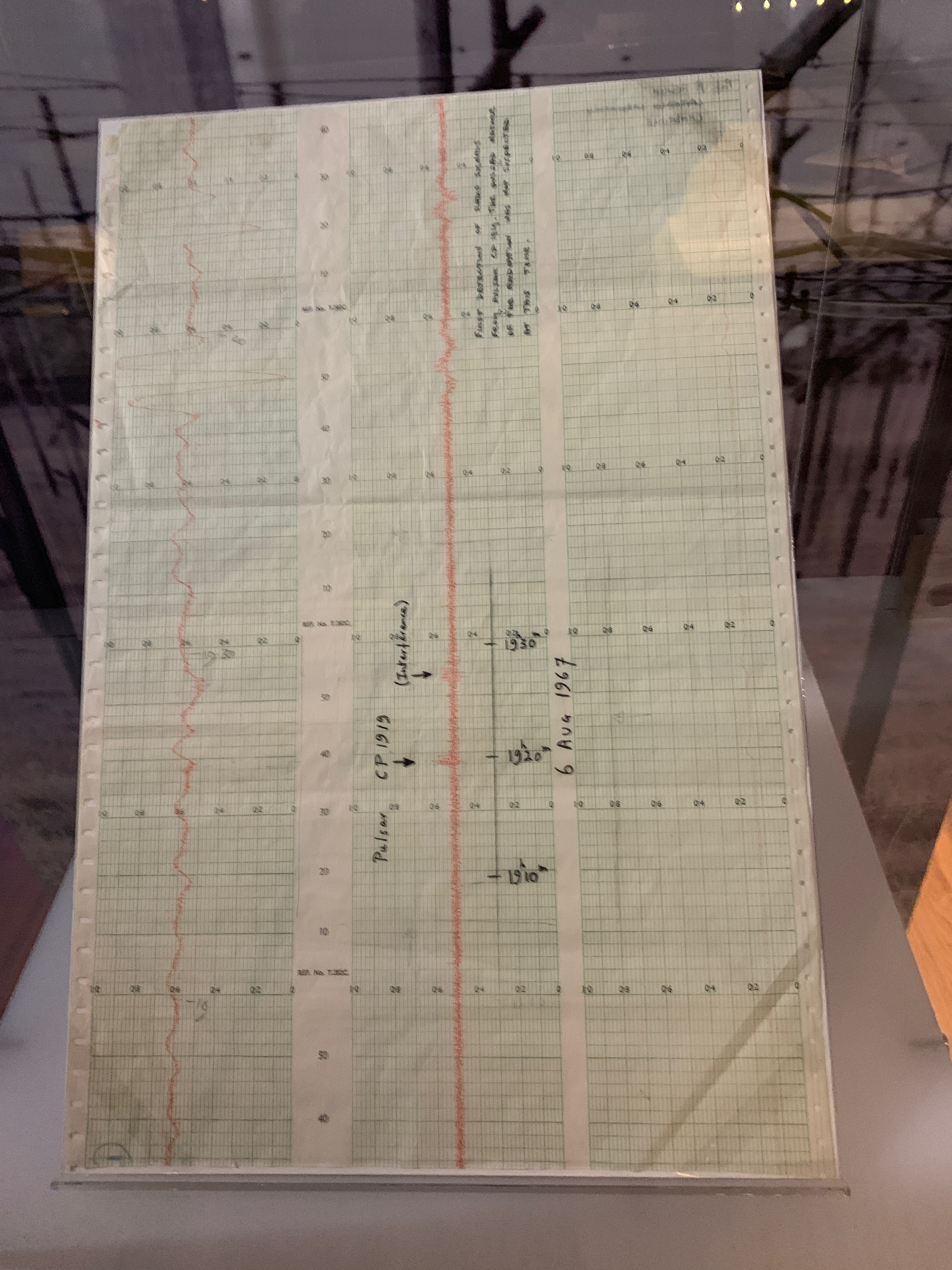
- Chart on which Jocelyn Bell Burnell first recognised evidence of PSR B1919+21, exhibited at Cambridge University Library

Observation data Epoch J2000 (ICRS) Equinox ICRS
- Constellation: Vulpecula
- Right ascension: 19^{h} 21^{m} 44.815^{s}
- Declination: +21° 53′ 02.25″

Characteristics
- Evolutionary stage: Pulsar

Astrometry
Distance	1,000+2,600 −700 ly (300+800 −200 pc)

Details
Mass	~1.4 M_{☉}
Radius	~1.4 × 10^{−5} R_{☉}
Luminosity	0.006 L_{☉}
Rotation	1.3373021601895 s
Age	16 Myr

Other designations
- PSR J1921+2153, PSR 1921+2153, PSR B1919+21, PSR 1919+21, WSTB 12W15, CP 1919+21, CP 1919, LGM-1

Database references
SIMBAD	data

PSR B1919+21 is a pulsar with a period of 1.3373 seconds and a pulse width of 0.04 seconds. Discovered by Jocelyn Bell Burnell on 28 November 1967, it is the first-discovered radio pulsar. The power and regularity of its signal were briefly thought to resemble an extraterrestrial beacon, leading the source to be nicknamed LGM, later LGM-1 (for "little green men").

The original designation of this pulsar was CP 1919, which stands for Cambridge Pulsar at RA 19^{h} 19^{m} . It is also known as PSR J1921+2153 and is located in the constellation of Vulpecula.

== Discovery ==
In 1967, a radio signal was detected using the Interplanetary Scintillation Array of the Mullard Radio Astronomy Observatory in Cambridge, UK, by Jocelyn Bell Burnell. The signal had a 1.337302088331-second period (in 1991) and 0.04-second pulsewidth. It originated at celestial coordinates 19^{h} 19^{m} right ascension, +21° declination. It was detected by individual observation of miles of graphical data traces. Due to its almost perfect regularity, it was at first assumed to be spurious noise, but this hypothesis was promptly discarded. The discoverers jokingly named it little green men 1 (LGM-1), considering that it may have originated from an extraterrestrial civilisation, but Bell Burnell soon cast doubt extraterrestrial life as a source after discovering a similar signal from another part of the sky.

The original signal turned out to be radio emissions from the pulsar CP 1919, and was the first one recognised as such. Bell Burnell noted that other scientists could have discovered pulsars before her, but their observations were either ignored or disregarded. Researchers Thomas Gold and Fred Hoyle identified this astronomical object as a rapidly rotating neutron star immediately upon their announcement.

Before the nature of the signal was determined, the researchers, Bell Burnell and her PhD supervisor Antony Hewish, considered the possibility of extraterrestrial life:

We did not really believe that we had picked up signals from another civilization, but obviously the idea had crossed our minds and we had no proof that it was an entirely natural radio emission. It is an interesting problem—if one thinks one may have detected life elsewhere in the universe[,] how does one announce the results responsibly? Who does one tell first?

== Nobel Prize controversy ==
When Antony Hewish and Martin Ryle received the Nobel Prize in physics in 1974 for their work in radio astronomy and pulsars, Fred Hoyle, Hewish's fellow astronomer, argued that Jocelyn Bell Burnell should have been a co-recipient of the prize.

In 2018, Bell won the $3 million Breakthrough Prize in Fundamental Physics for her work.

== Cultural references ==
The English post-punk band Joy Division used an image of CP 1919's radio pulses, created by radio astronomer Harold Craft, on the cover of their 1979 debut album, Unknown Pleasures.

German-born British composer Max Richter wrote a piece inspired by the discovery of CP1919 titled Journey (CP1919).

The English indie rock band Arctic Monkeys used a sound based on the pulses in their music video for "Four Out of Five".

The American electronic music group Deathpact released a song titled B1919+21 on their 2026 album FROM DARKNESS, COMES LIGHT.

== See also ==
- Variable star
