= Interplanetary Scintillation Array =

Phased array radio telescope built in 1967

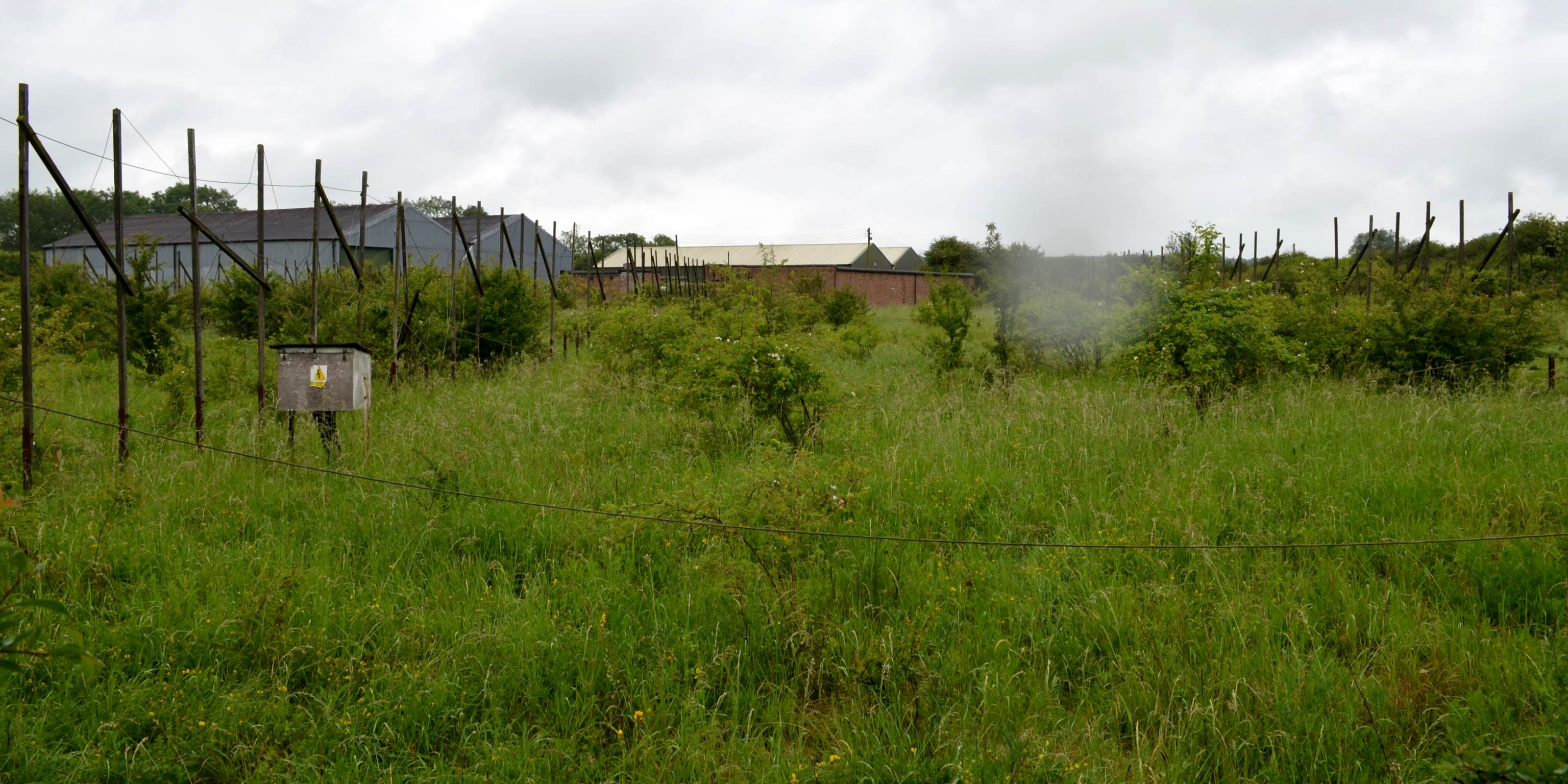
- Location: Cambridge, Cambridgeshire, East of England, England
- Coordinates: 52°09′47″N 0°02′04″E
- Location within the United Kingdom
- Related media on Commons

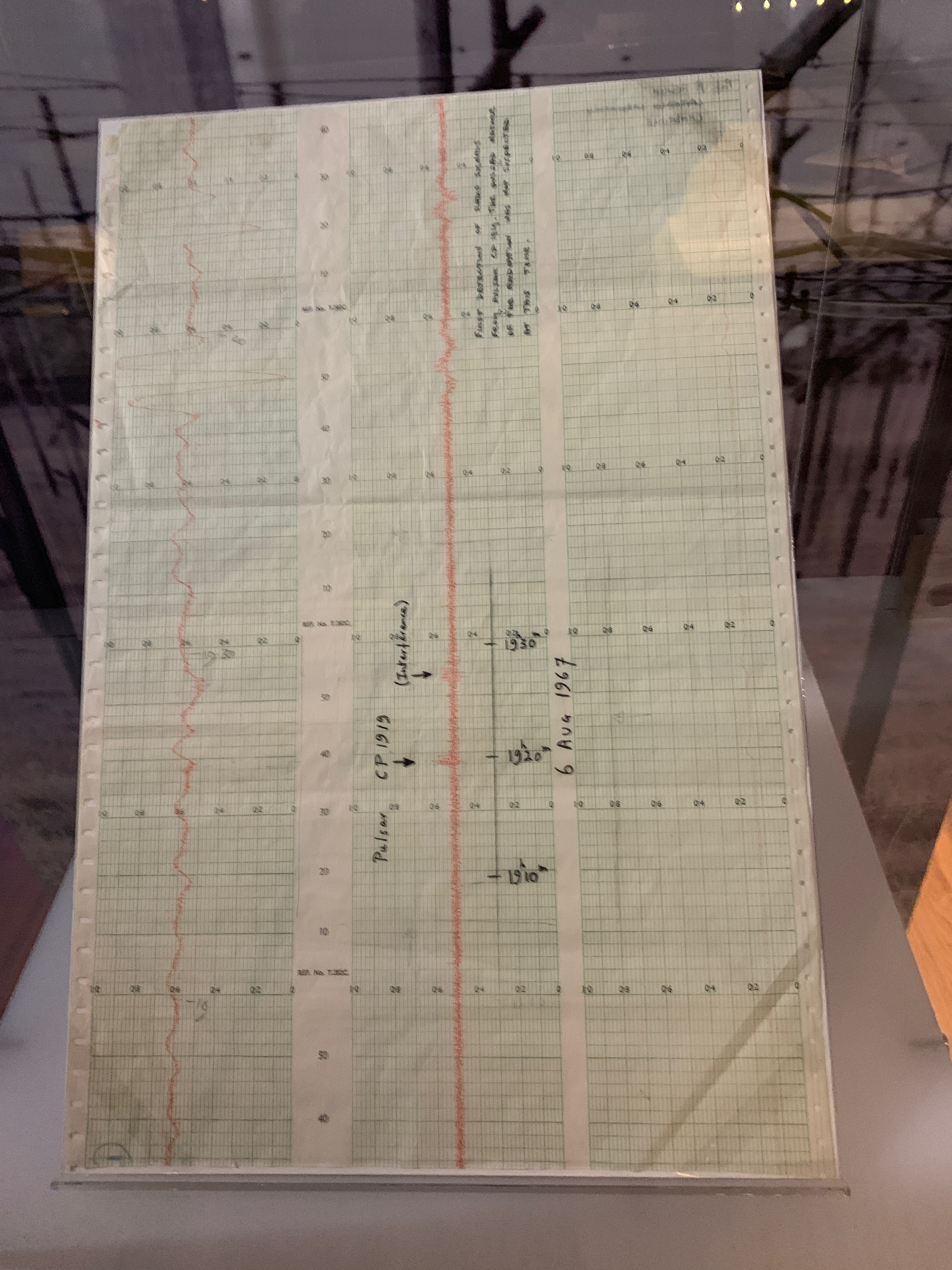
Chart on which Jocelyn Bell Burnell first recognised evidence of a pulsar, later designated PSR B1919+21 (exhibited at Cambridge University Library)

The Interplanetary Scintillation Array (also known as the IPS Array or Pulsar Array) is a radio telescope that was built in 1967 at the Mullard Radio Astronomy Observatory, in Cambridge, United Kingdom, and was operated by the Cavendish Astrophysics Group. The instrument originally covered 4 acres (16,000 m^{2}). It was enlarged to 9 acres in 1978, and was refurbished in 1989.

The array operates at a radio frequency of 81.5 MHz (3.7 m wavelength), and is made up of 4,096 dipole antennas in a phased array. Using 14 beams, it can map the northern sky in one day. The observatory's staff use sheep to keep grass away from the antennas because a lawn mower cannot fit in the spaces.

Antony Hewish designed the IPS Array to measure the high-frequency fluctuations of radio sources, originally for monitoring interplanetary scintillation. Hewish received a Nobel Prize after the high time-resolution of the array allowed Jocelyn Bell to discover allowed the pulsar in 1967.

The IPS Array has more recently been used to track and help forecast interplanetary weather, and specifically to monitor the solar wind. It is now essentially retired, and has lost a significant fraction of its area.
