= Half-Mile Telescope =

Radio telescope

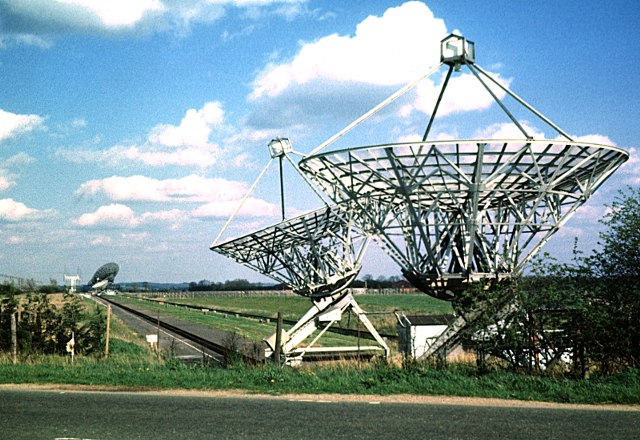
- The Half-Mile Telescope in May 1977: 2 fixed dishes in the foreground and 2 moveable ones in the distance (just in front of the 2 larger and darker dishes of the One-Mile Telescope)
- Location: United Kingdom
- Coordinates: 52°09′49″N 0°02′08″E
- Location within the United Kingdom
- Related media on Commons

The Half-Mile Telescope was constructed in 1968 (2 aerials) at the Mullard Radio Astronomy Observatory with two more aerials being added in 1972, using donated dishes (total cost was £70,000). Two of the dishes are fixed, while two are moveable and share the One-Mile's rail track; to obtain information from the maximum number of different baselines, 30 days of observing were required. Observing frequency 1.4 GHz (21 cm wavelength), bandwidth 4 MHz. Used for Hydrogen Line studies of nearby galaxies and produced the first good radio maps of hydrogen distribution (as a function of its velocity), for M33 and M31 (also produced nearly 20 PhDs and 50 published papers). The telescope was operated by the Radio Astronomy Group of the Cambridge University.

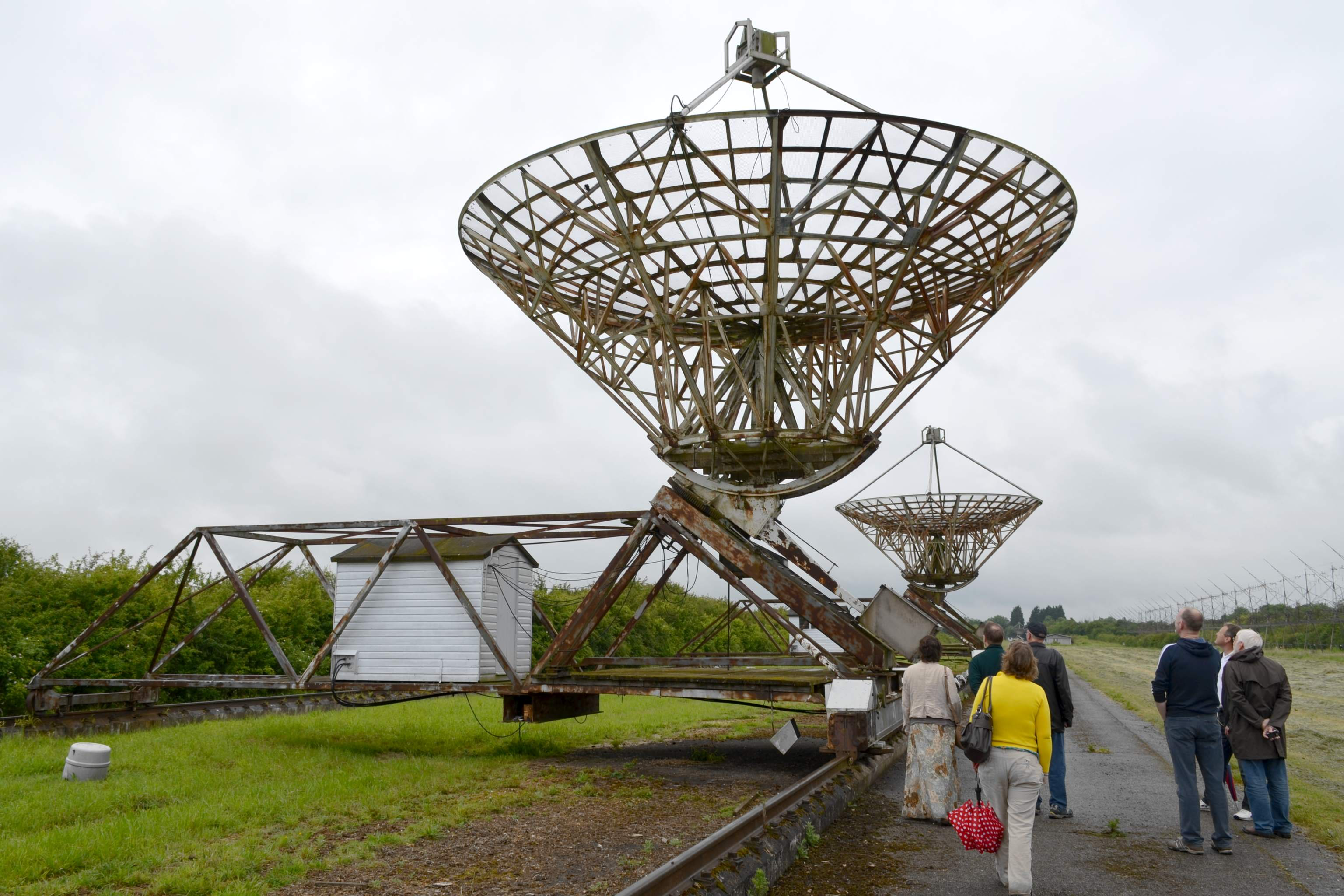
Two antennas of the Half-Mile Telescope in June 2014

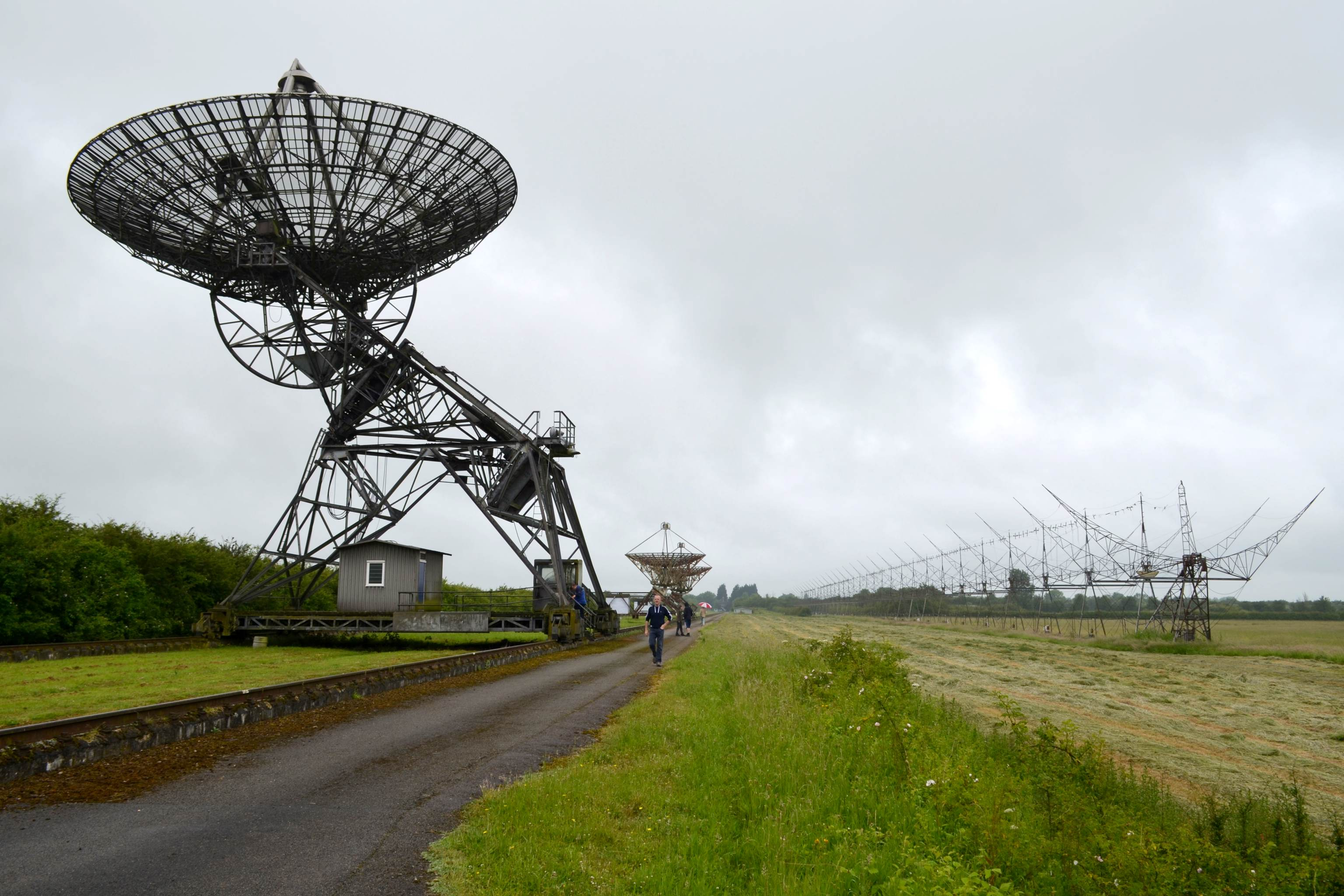
One antenna of the One-Mile Telescope (left), two of the Half-Mile Telescope (centre) and the remains of the 4C Array (right) in June 2014
