= Arcminute Microkelvin Imager =

Pair of interferometric radio telescopes

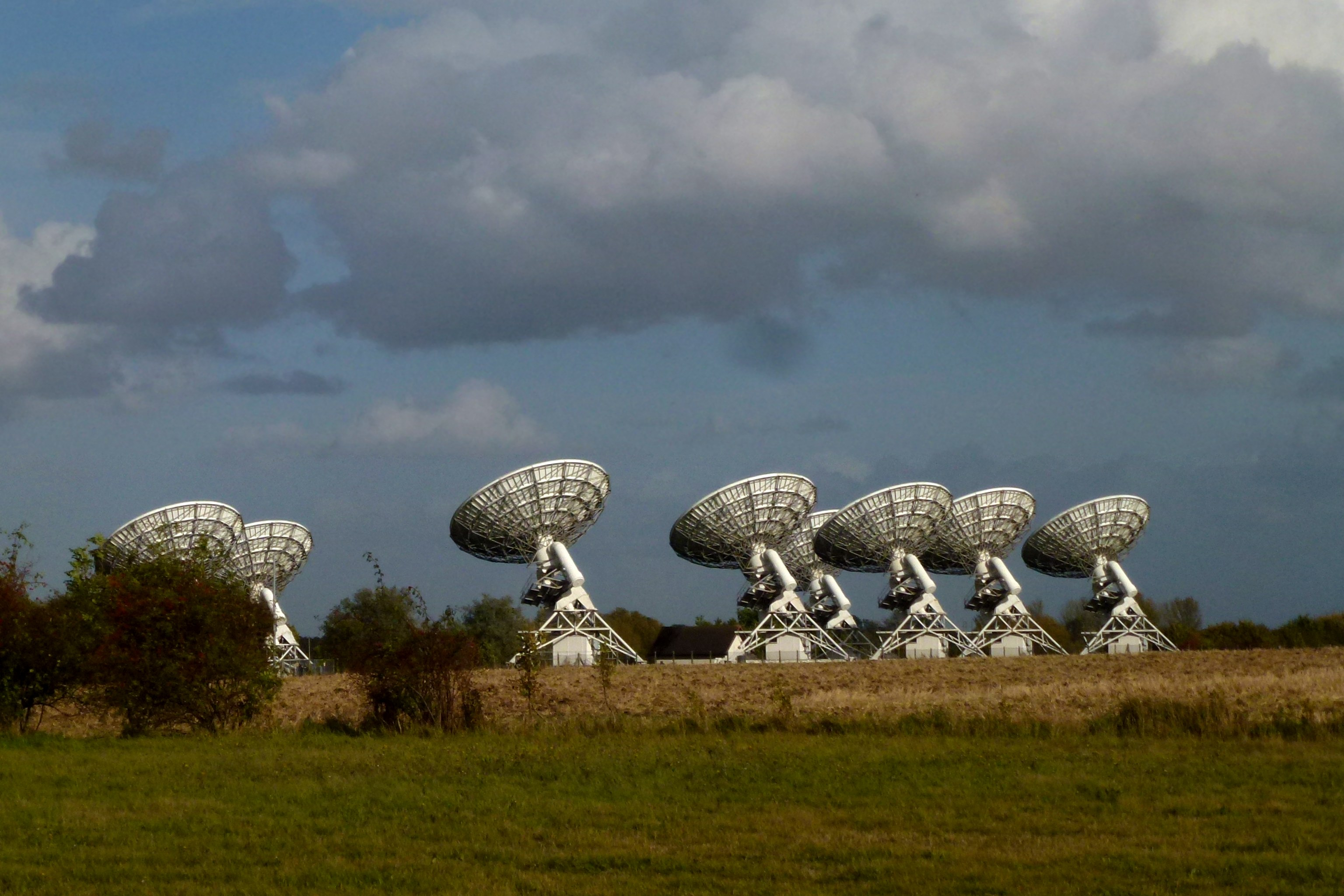
- The 8 antennas of the Arcminute Microkelvin Imager Large Array viewed from Barton Road in 2012
- Location: Cambridge, Cambridgeshire, East of England, England
- Coordinates: 52°10′11″N 0°03′33″E
- Altitude: 15 m (49 ft)
- Website: www.mrao.cam.ac.uk/outreach/radio-telescopes/ami/
- Location within the United Kingdom
- Related media on Commons

The Arcminute Microkelvin Imager (AMI) consists of a pair of interferometric radio telescopes (ie. two arrays) - the Small and Large Arrays - located at the Mullard Radio Astronomy Observatory near Cambridge. AMI was designed, built and is operated by the Cavendish Astrophysics Group. AMI was designed, primarily, for the study of galaxy clusters by observing secondary anisotropies in the cosmic microwave background (CMB) arising from the Sunyaev–Zel'dovich (SZ) effect. Both arrays are used to observe radiation with frequencies between 12 and 18 GHz, and have very similar system designs. The telescopes are used to observe both previously known galaxy clusters, in an attempt to determine, for example, their masses and temperatures, and to carry out surveys, in order to locate previously undiscovered clusters.

== AMI Large Array ==
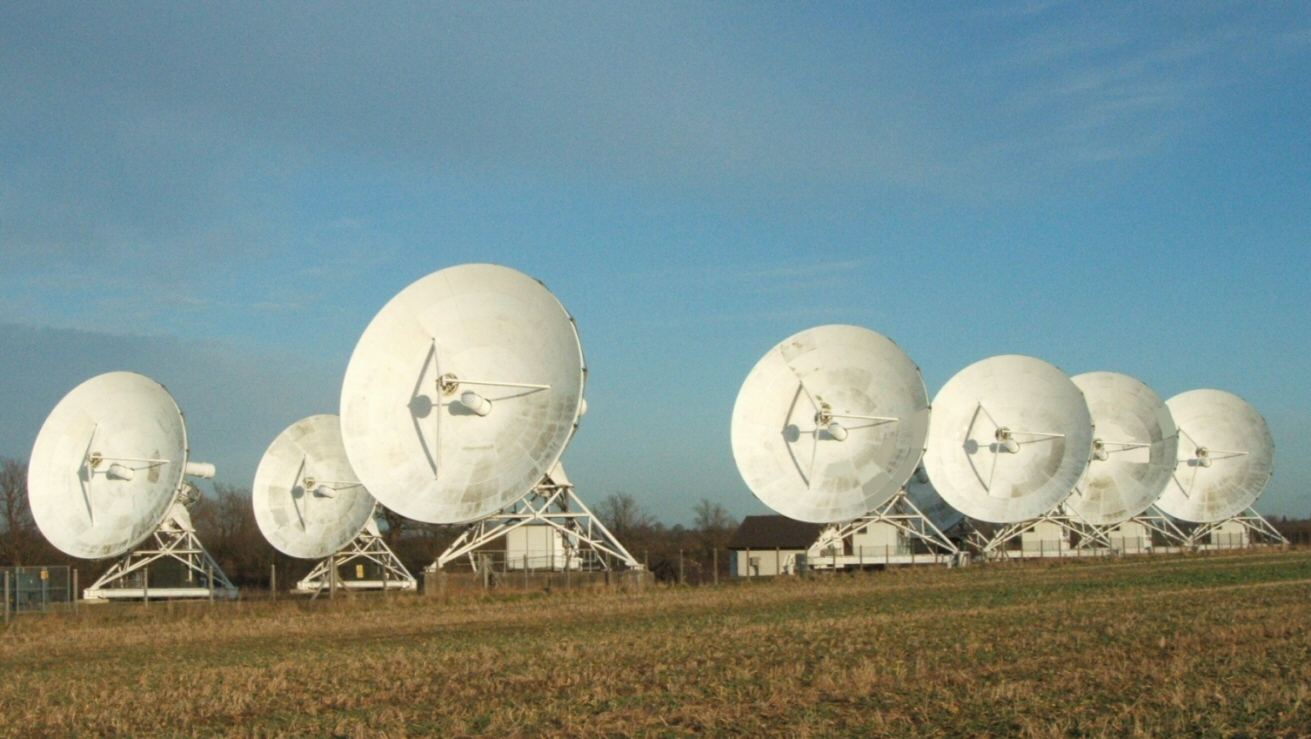
AMI Large Array

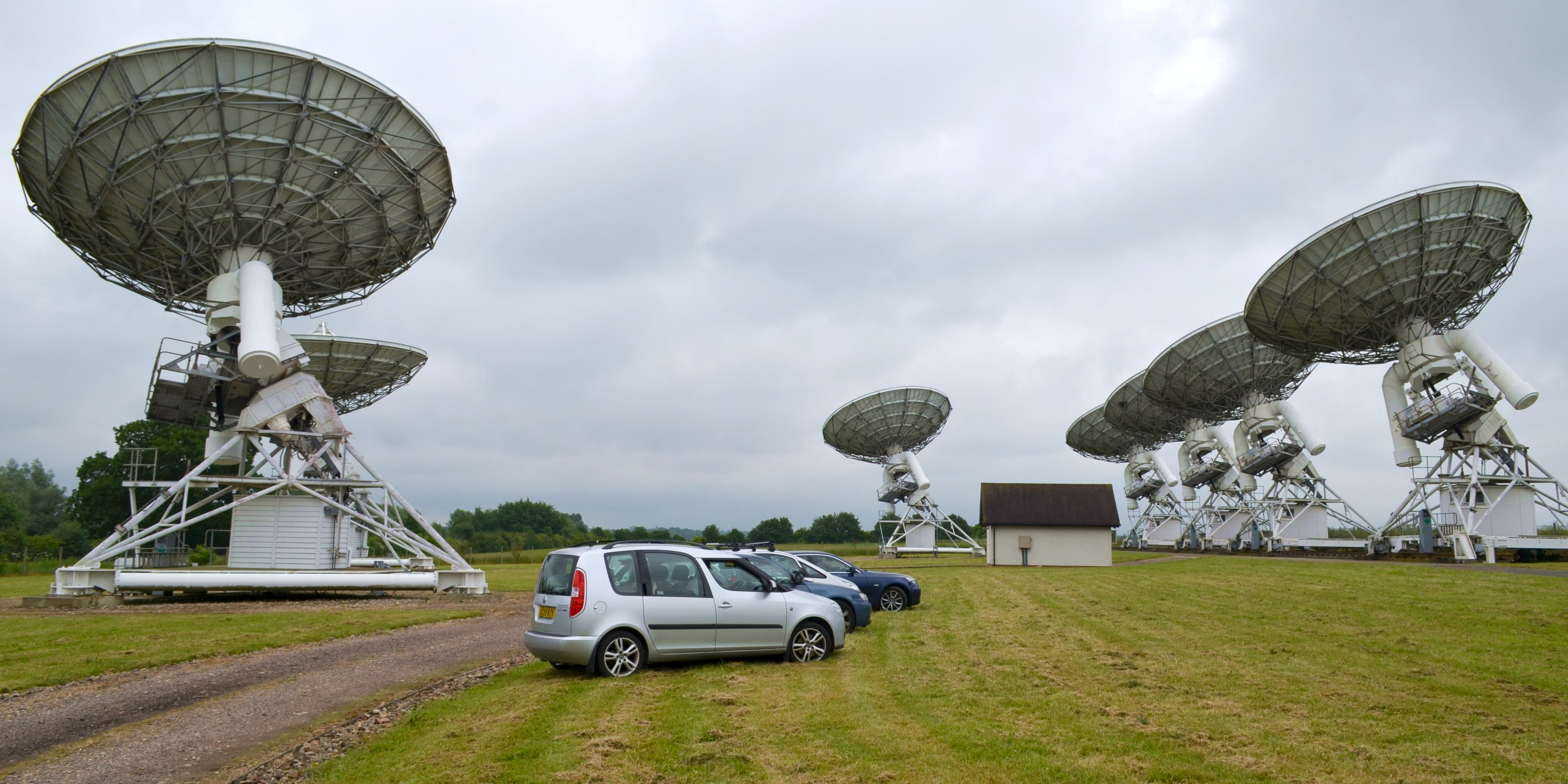
AMI Large Array in June 2014

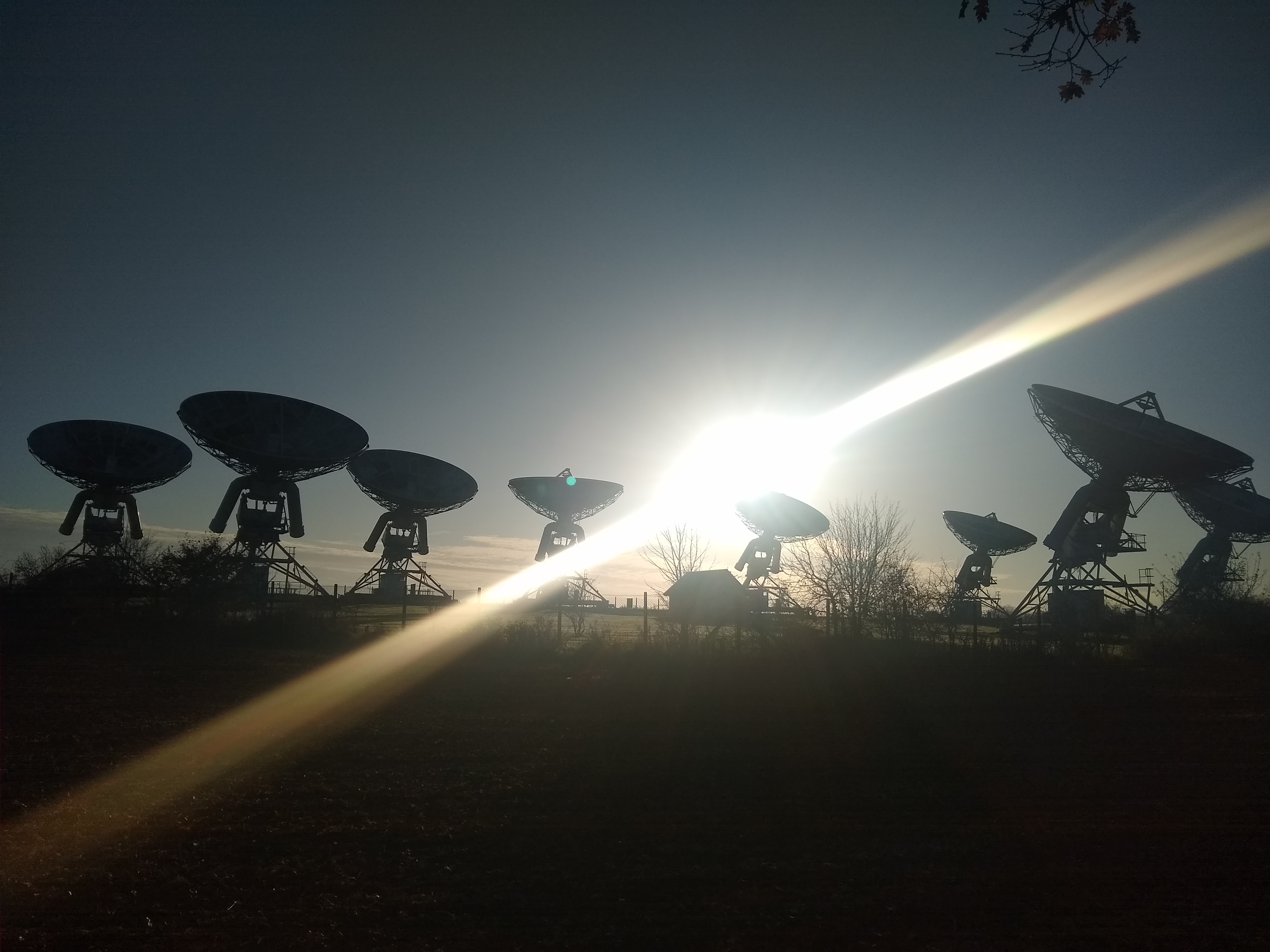
AMI Large Array silhouette in 2020

The AMI Large Array (AMI LA) is composed of eight 12.8-metre-diameter, equatorially mounted parabolic antennas, which were previously part of the Ryle Telescope. The antennas are separated by distances ranging between 18 and 110 m. The telescope has an angular resolution of approximately 30 arcseconds. The LA is used to image the radio sources (mainly radio galaxies) that contaminate the Small Array observations of the CMB. The LA is being used to carry out the Tenth Cambridge Survey of radio sources. The first results from the survey were used to extend the measured 15-GHz source counts to sub-millijansky levels; this is an order of magnitude deeper than achieved by the Ninth Cambridge Survey, which was the first survey of significant sky coverage at a comparable radio frequency.

== AMI Small Array ==
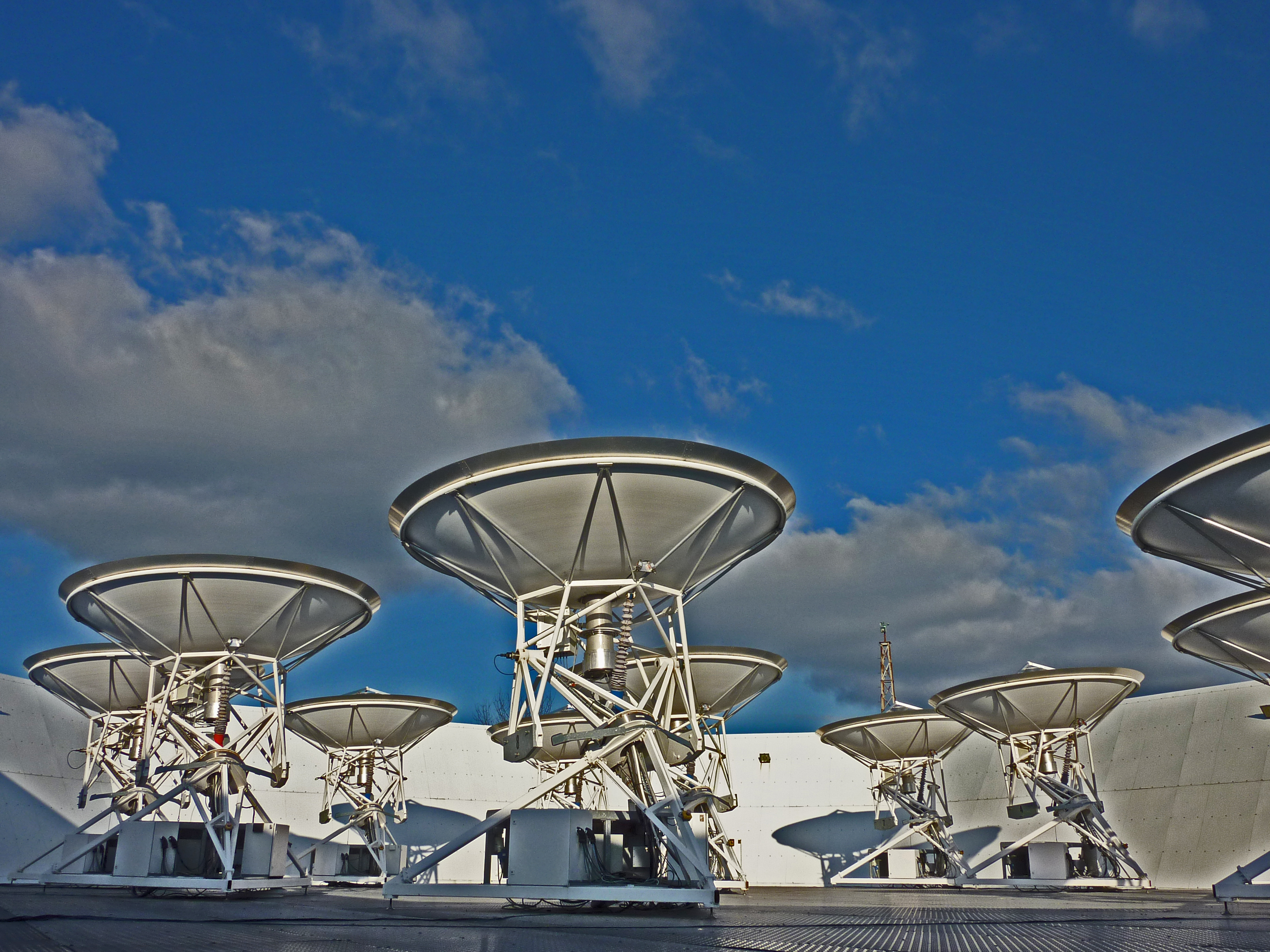
AMI Small Array

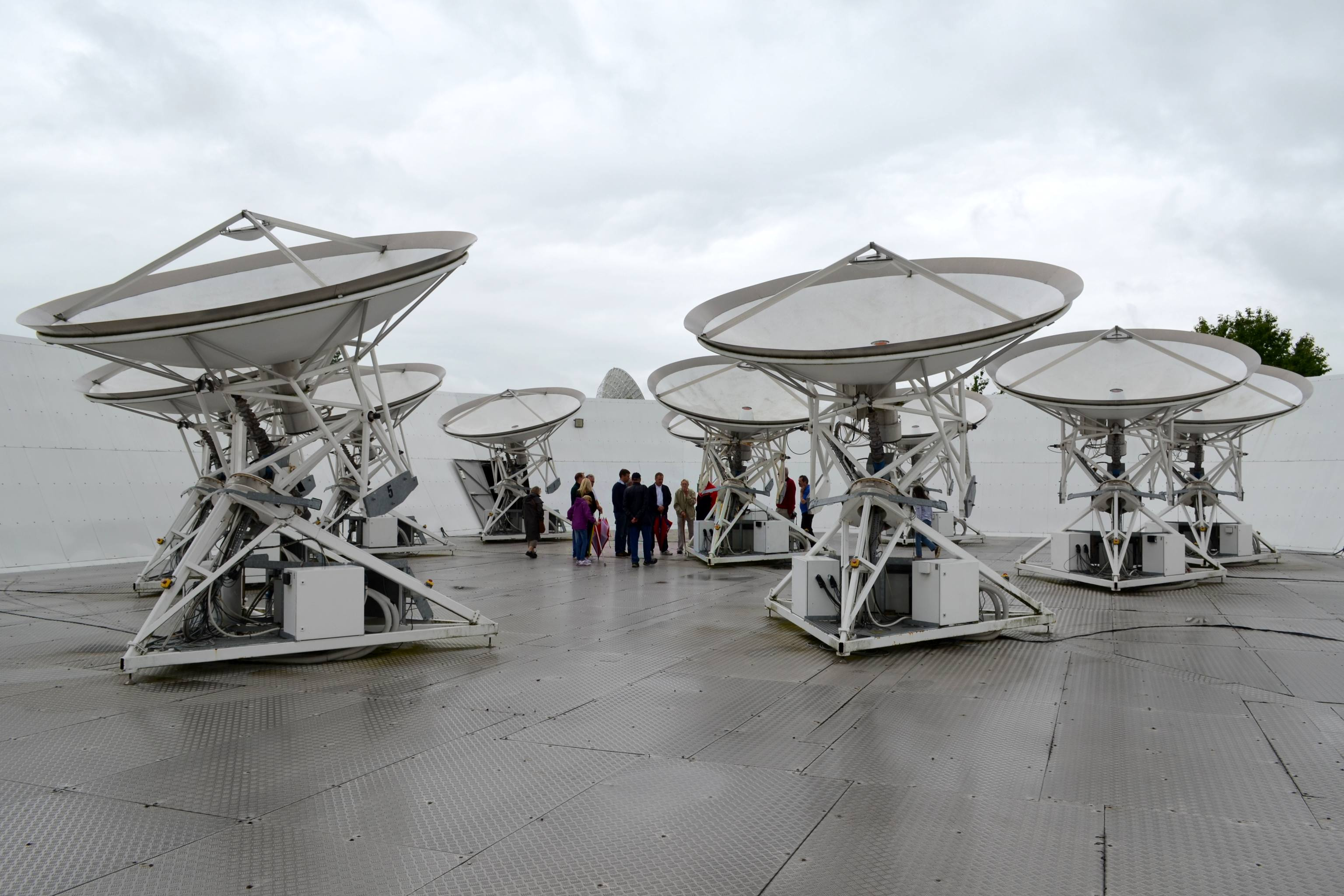
AMI Small Array in June 2014

The AMI Small Array (AMI SA) consists of 10 3.7-m-diameter antennas, similar in design to those of the LA. They are arranged at intervals of between 5 and 20 m. The SA has an angular resolution of approximately 3 arcminutes and is used to image, at high resolution, the galaxy clusters of interest. The SA is being used to search for previously unknown galaxy clusters; results from the first such cluster, detected using AMI, were released in December 2010. In addition to observations of galaxy clusters, the SA has been used to carry out observations, amongst other things, towards supernova remnants and anomalous microwave emission.

== See also ==
- South Pole Telescope
- Sunyaev-Zel'dovich Array
- Atacama Cosmology Telescope
