= Ryle Telescope =

Radio telescope array

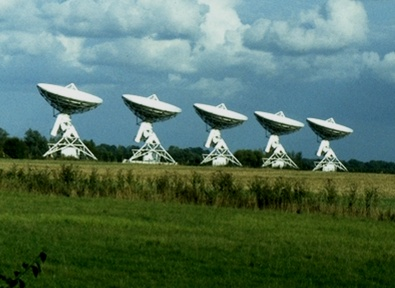
- The Ryle Telescope was re-arranged to form the AMI Large Array after this photo was taken in 2005
- Alternative names: 5-km Array
- Location(s): Cambridgeshire, East of England, England
- Coordinates: 52°10′11″N 0°03′34″E
- Location of Ryle Telescope
- Related media on Commons

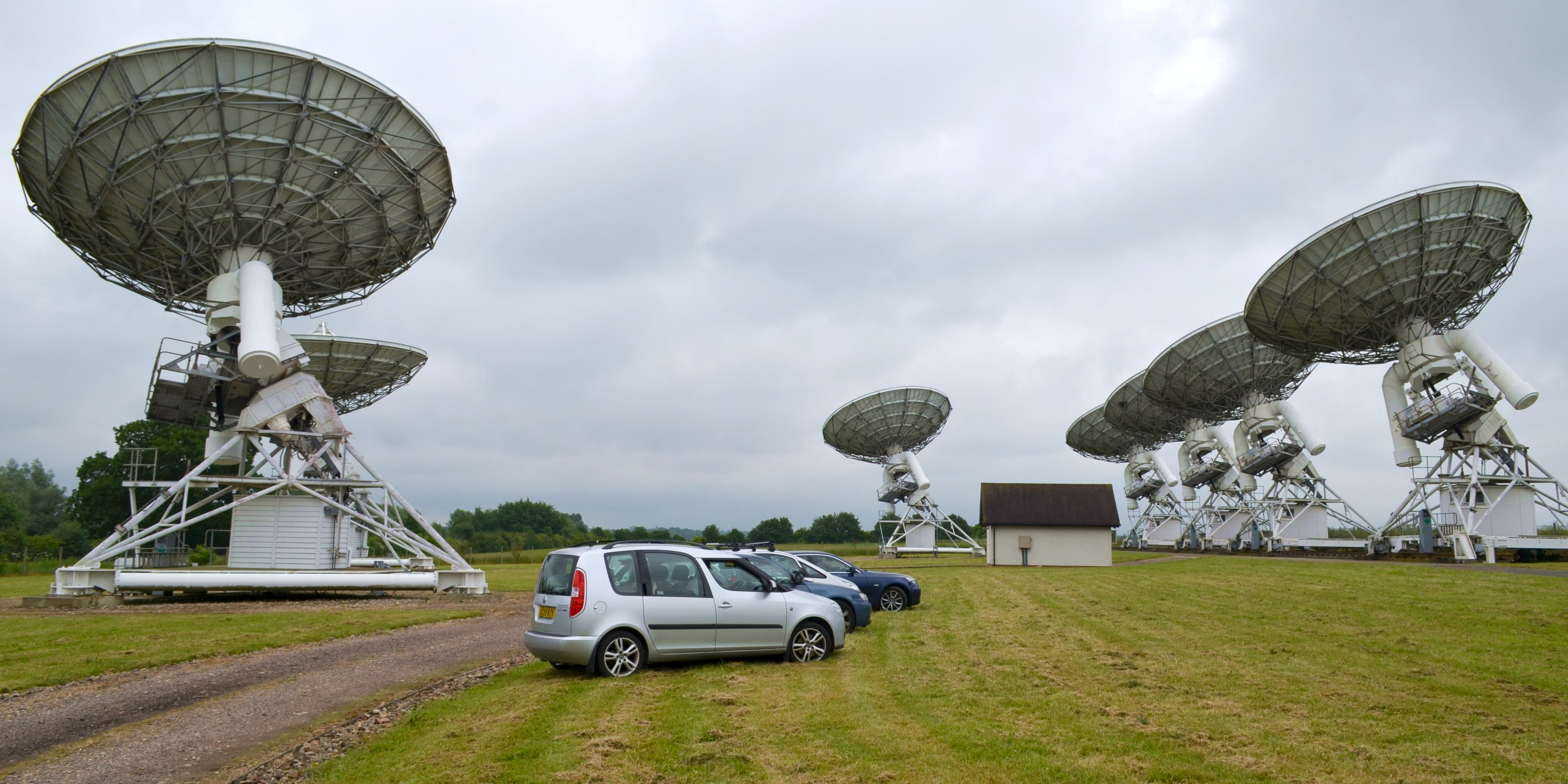
The three AMI-LA antennas left of the hut in this June 2014 photograph were the ones moved in 2014

The Ryle Telescope (named after Martin Ryle, and formerly known as the 5-km Array) was a linear east-west radio telescope array at the Mullard Radio Astronomy Observatory. In 2004, three of the telescopes were moved to create a compact two-dimensional array of telescopes at the east end of the interferometer. The eight antennas have now become the Arcminute Microkelvin Imager Large Array.

== Design ==
The Ryle Telescope was an eight-element interferometer operating at 15 GHz (2cm wavelength). The elements were equatorially mounted 13-m Cassegrain antennas, on an (almost) east-west baseline. Four aerials were mounted on a 1.2 km rail track, and the others were fixed at 1.2 km intervals. Baselines between 18 m and 4.8 km were therefore available, in a variety of configurations. For high-resolution imaging, the mobile aerials were arranged along the track, to give uniform baseline coverage to 4.8 km; for low-brightness astronomy (e.g. the Sunyaev-Zel'dovich effect) the mobile aerials were arranged in a 'compact array', with a maximum baseline of about 100 m. All antenna pairs were correlated, so some long baseline data were always available, even in the 'compact array' configuration.

As the telescope was an east-west instrument, most imaging observations involved 12-hour observations in order to fill the synthesised aperture (calibration observations are routinely interleaved). Another consequence of the geometry was that it is not practical to image sources near the equator, or in the south. The two-dimensional Large Array overcomes this problem with its new north-south baselines.

Although the telescope was not designed as a common user instrument, the operators were happy to accept proposals for observing time on the instrument from outside observers, provided that they did not overlap substantially with existing observing programmes, on a 'best efforts' basis. Monitoring variable sources was possible using short observations which could often be inserted between longer 'standard' observations.

The telescope had three main scientific programs: study of the Sunyaev-Zel'dovich effect in galaxy clusters, particularly in determining the Hubble constant; surveying for radio sources that would contaminate degree-scale observations of the cosmic microwave background made with the Very Small Array, and flux monitoring of galactic variable sources.
