= Cambridge Optical Aperture Synthesis Telescope =

English astronomical interferometer observatory

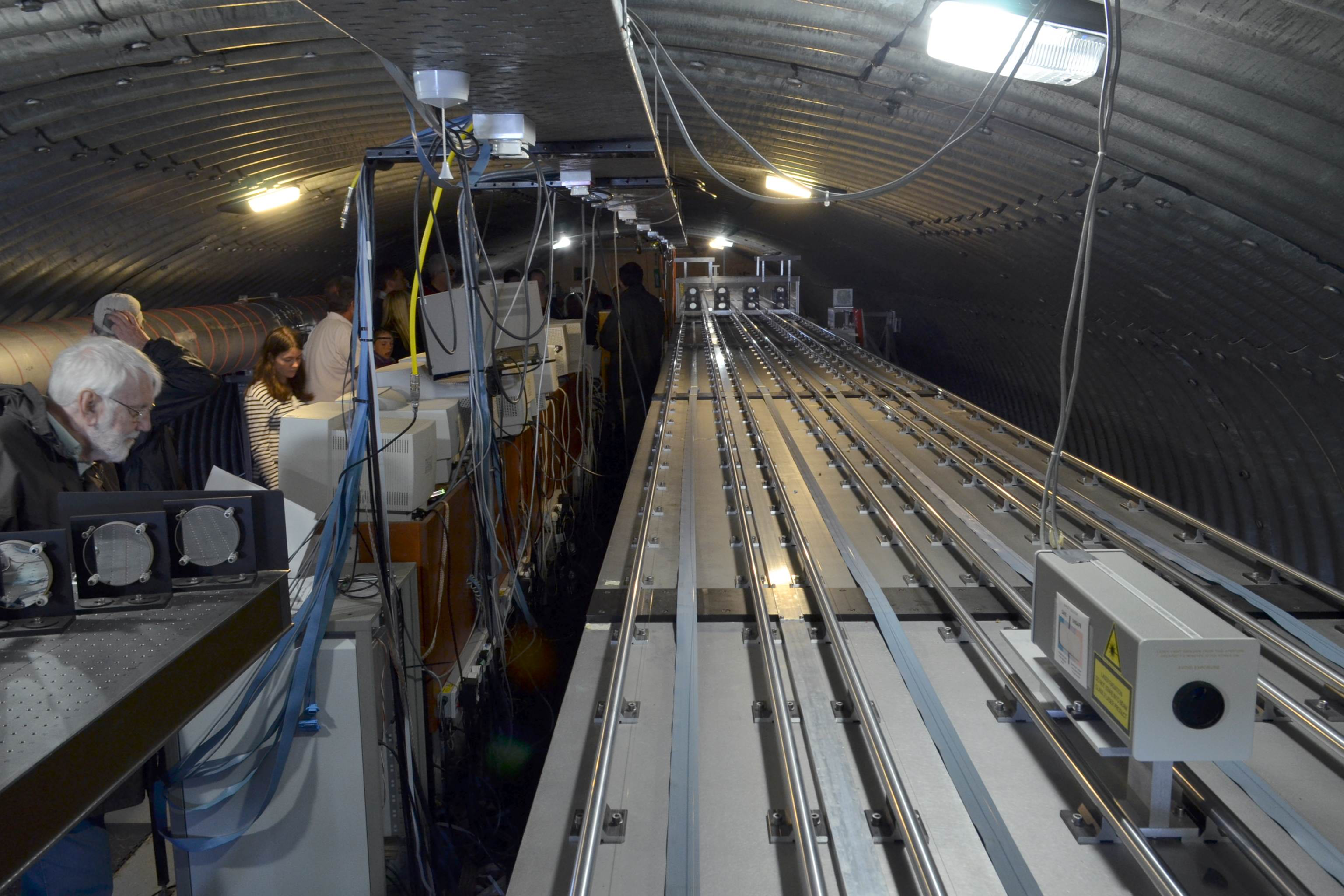
- The interior of the COAST bunker in June 2014
- Alternative names: COAST
- Location(s): Cambridge, Cambridgeshire, East of England, England
- Coordinates: 52°09′50″N 0°02′28″E
- Website: www.mrao.cam.ac.uk/telescopes/coast/
- Location of Cambridge Optical Aperture Synthesis Telescope
- Related media on Commons

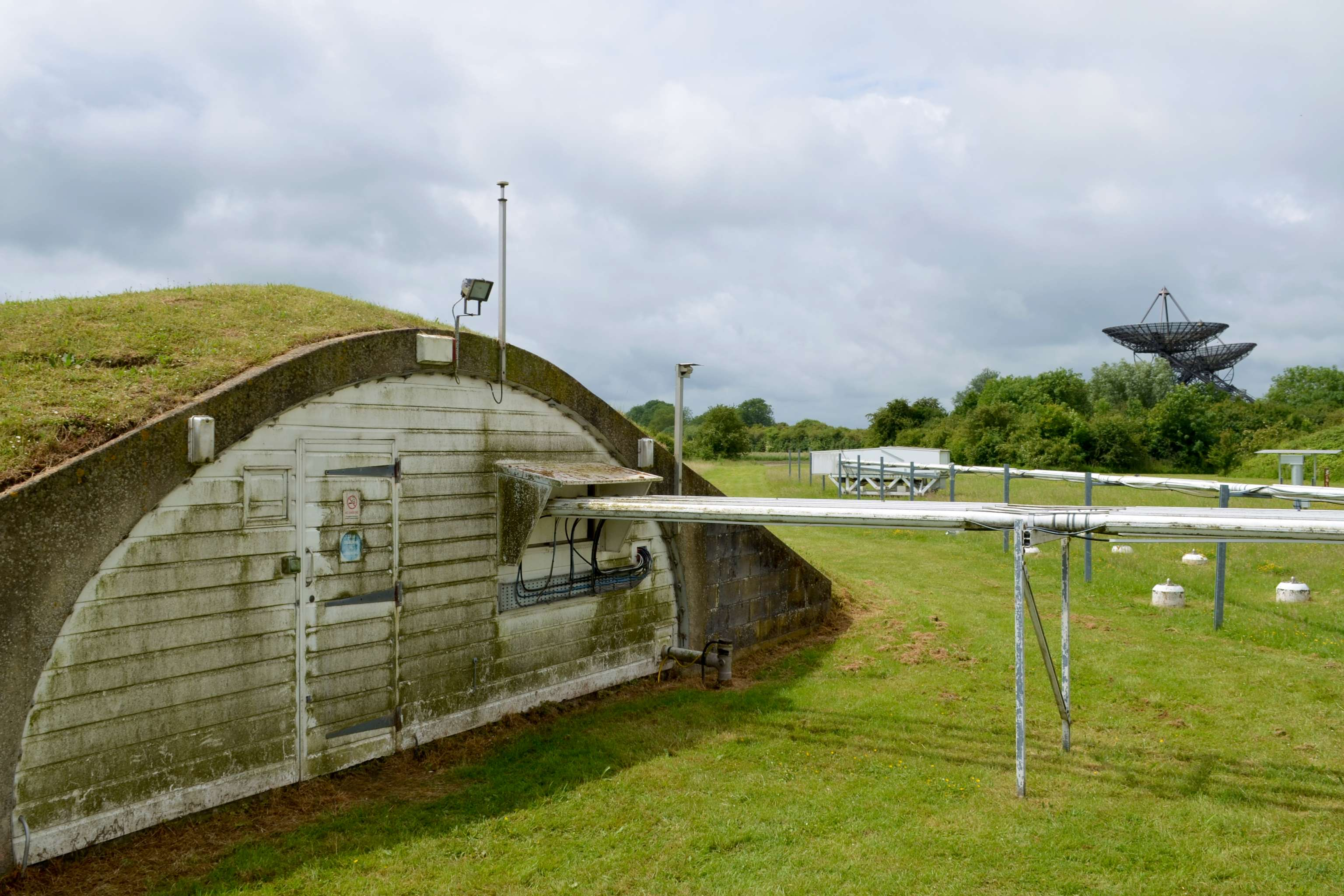
Part of COAST and the exterior of its bunker in June 2014

COAST, the Cambridge Optical Aperture Synthesis Telescope, is a multi-element optical astronomical interferometer with baselines of up to 100 metres, which uses aperture synthesis to observe stars with angular resolution as high as one thousandth of one arcsecond (producing much higher resolution images than individual telescopes, including the Hubble Space Telescope). The principal limitation is that COAST can only image bright stars.

COAST was the first long-baseline interferometer to obtain high-resolution images of the surfaces of stars other than Sun (although the surfaces of other stars had previously been imaged at lower resolution using aperture masking interferometry on the William Herschel Telescope).

The COAST array was conceived by John E. Baldwin and is operated by the Cavendish Astrophysics Group. It is situated at the Mullard Radio Astronomy Observatory in Cambridgeshire, England.

== See also ==
- List of observatories
- List of telescope types
