= Cambridge Low Frequency Synthesis Telescope =

Radio telescope

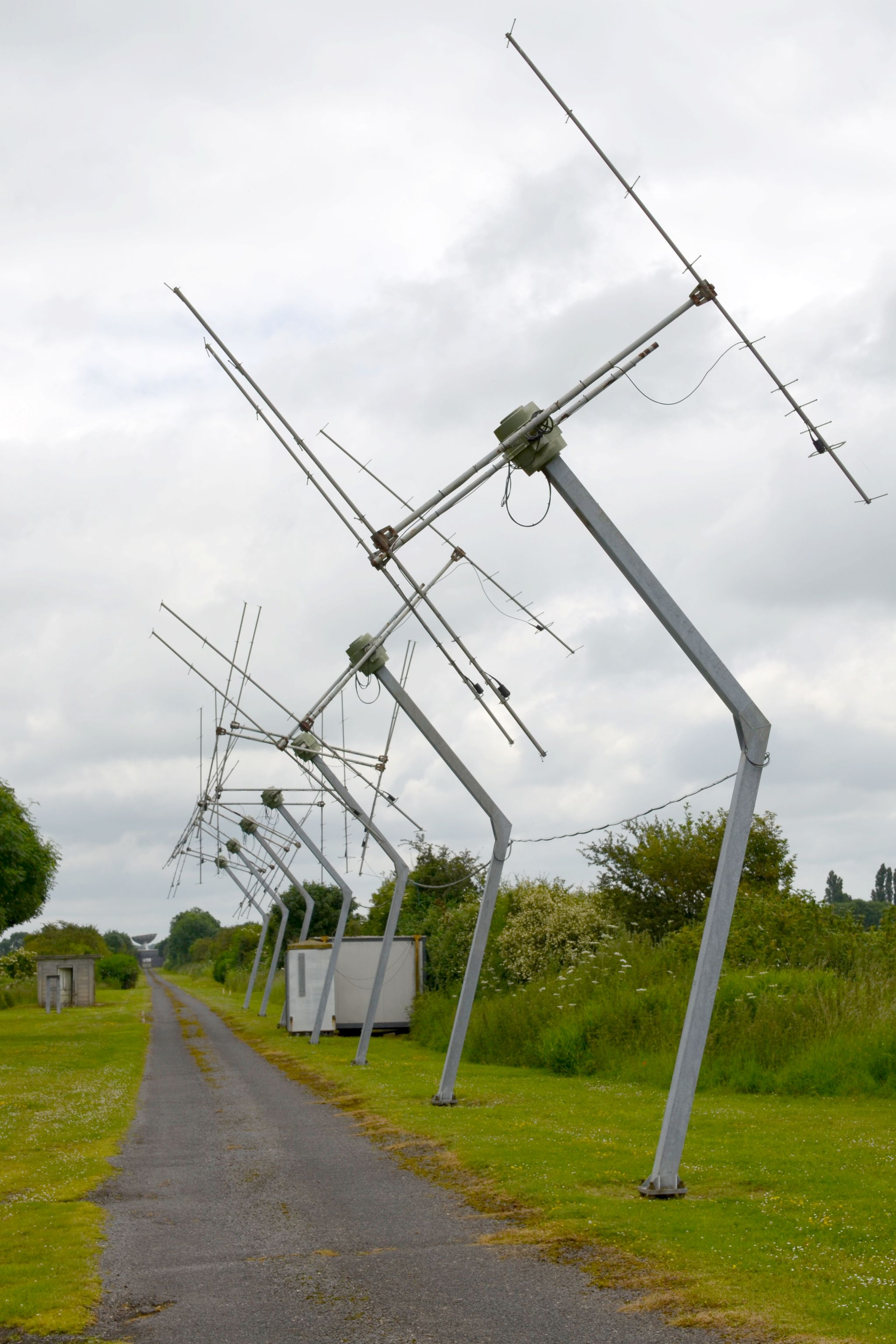
- Surviving Yagi antennas of the CLFST in June 2014
- Location: Cambridge, Cambridgeshire, East of England, England
- Coordinates: 52°10′13″N 0°02′33″E
- Wavelength: 38, 151 MHz (7.89, 1.99 m)
- Website: www.mrao.cam.ac.uk/outreach/radio-telescopes/clfst/
- Location within the United Kingdom
- Related media on Commons

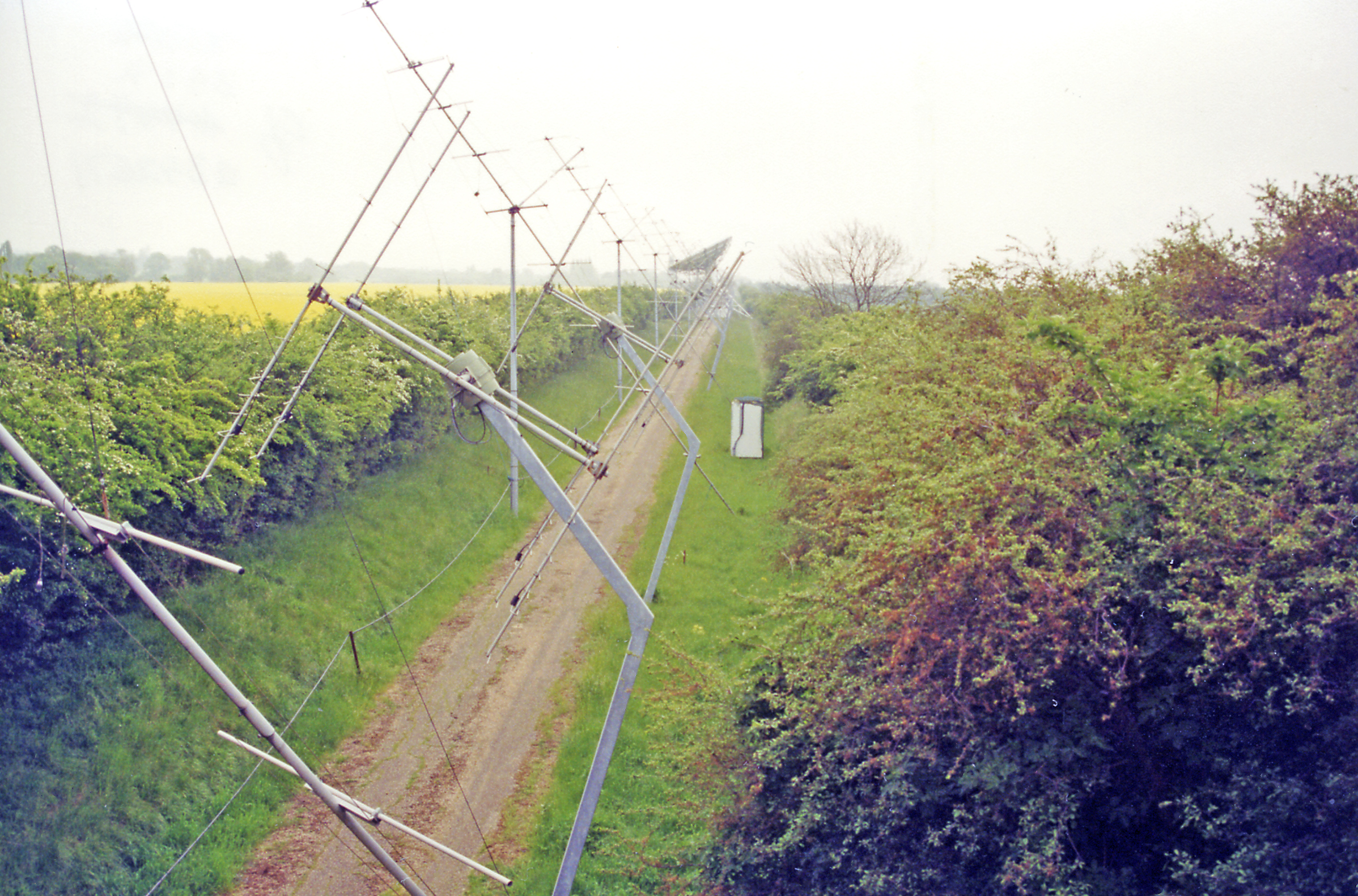
CLFST in May 1999

The Cambridge Low-Frequency Synthesis Telescope (CLFST) is an east–west aperture synthesis radio telescope currently operating at 151 MHz. It consists of 60 tracking yagis on a 4.6 km baseline, giving 776 simultaneous baselines. These provide a resolution of 70×70 cosec (declination) arcsec^{2}, with a sensitivity of about 30 to 50 mJy/beam, and a field of view of about 9°×9°. The telescope is situated at the Mullard Radio Astronomy Observatory.

The CLFST has made three astronomical catalogues of the Northern Hemisphere:

- 6C survey at 151 MHz
- 7C survey at 151 MHz
- 8C survey at 38 MHz.
