= One-Mile Telescope =

British array of radio telescopes

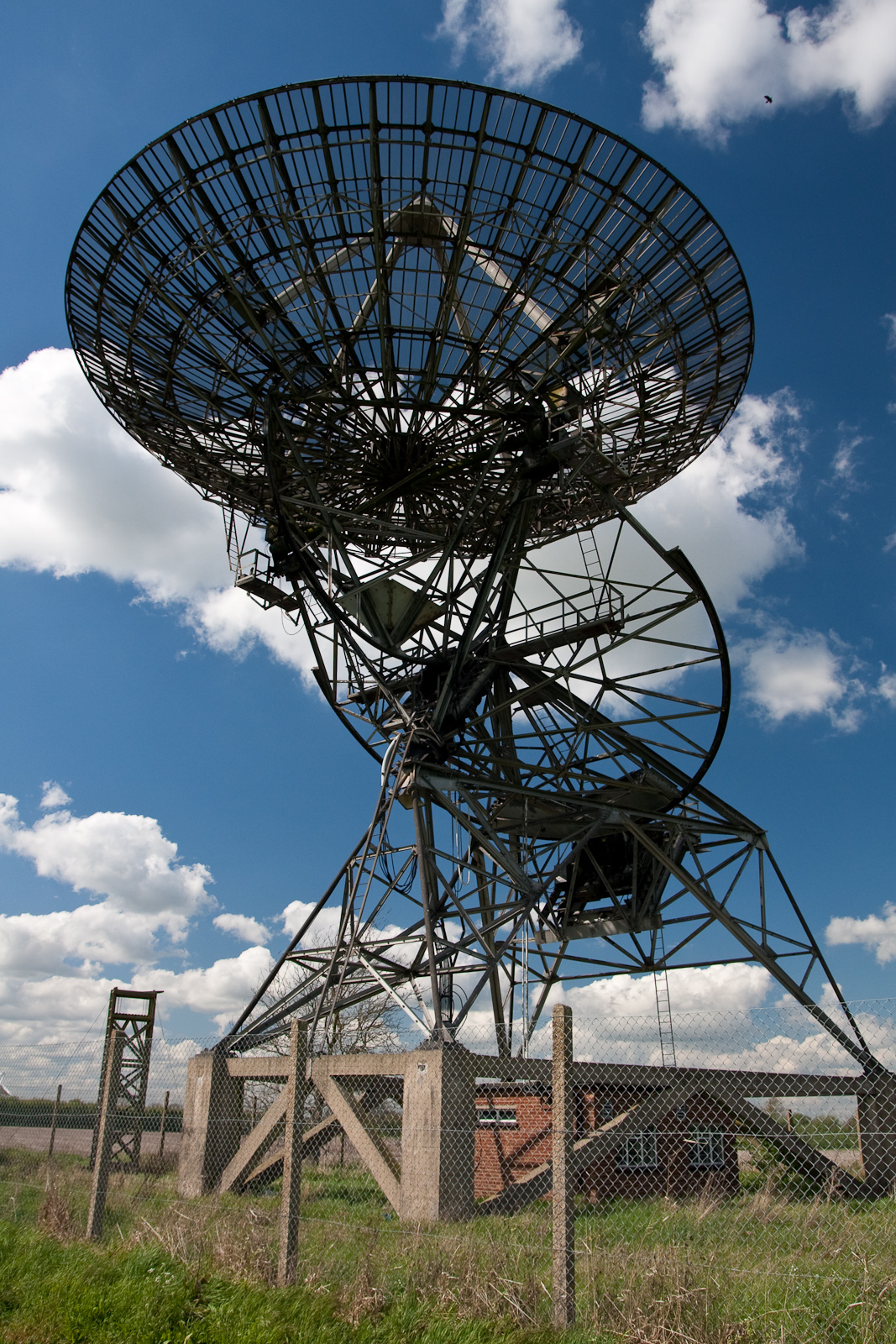
- Location(s): United Kingdom
- Coordinates: 52°09′49″N 0°02′14″E
- Location of One-Mile Telescope
- Related media on Commons

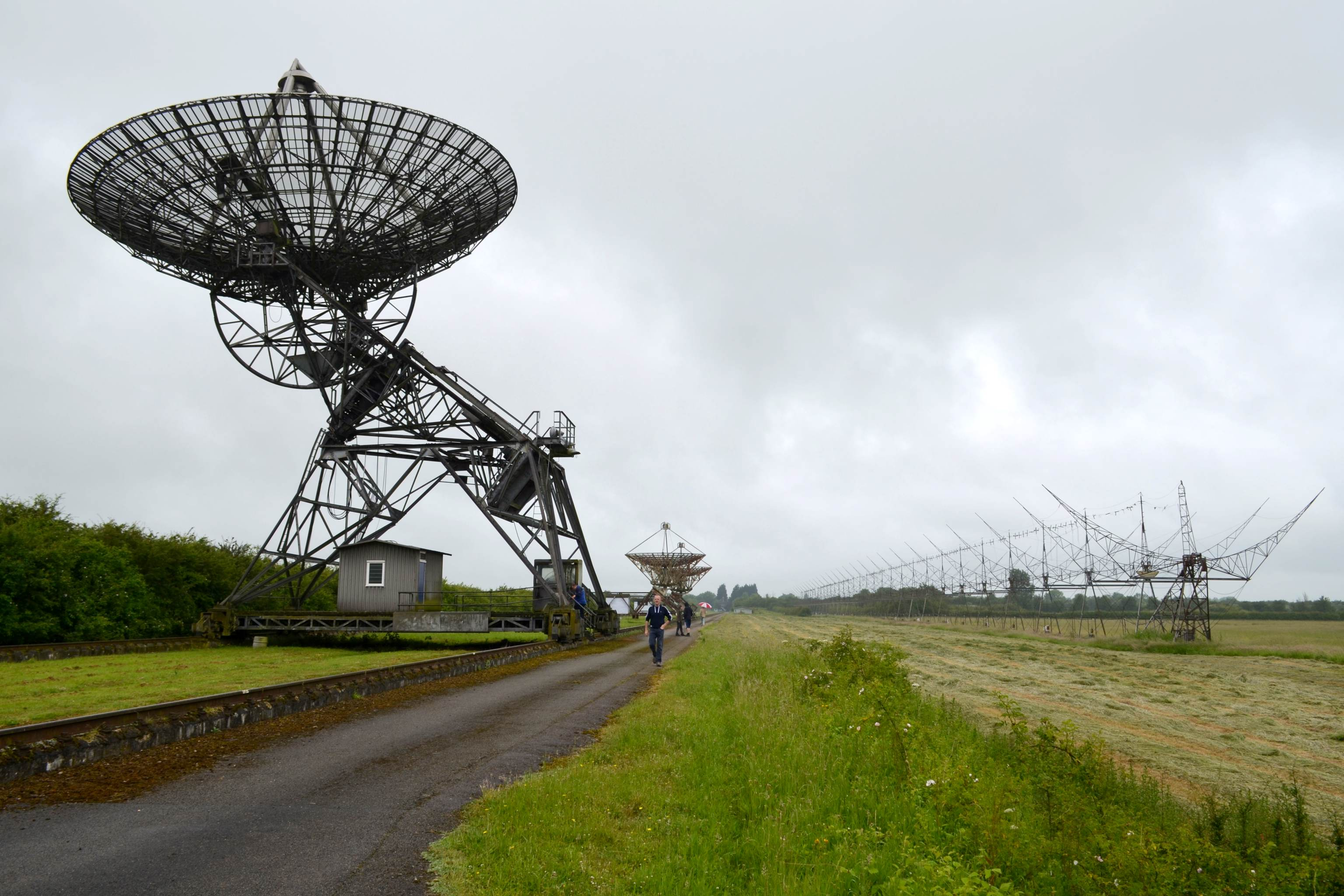
One antenna of the One-Mile Telescope (left), two of the Half-Mile Telescope (centre) and the remains of the 4C Array (right) in June 2014

The One-Mile Telescope at the Mullard Radio Astronomy Observatory (MRAO), Cambridge, UK is an array of radio telescopes (two fixed and one moveable, fully steerable 60 ft-diameter (18 m) parabolic reflectors operating simultaneously at 1407 MHz and 408 MHz) designed to perform aperture synthesis interferometry.

== History ==
The One Mile Telescope was completed by the Radio Astronomy Group of Cambridge University in 1964. The telescope was used to produce the 5C catalogue of radio sources.

Observations with larger incremental spacings were used to observe individual radio sources with unprecedented sensitivity, angular resolution, and image quality. These surveys required intensive use of inverse Fourier transforms, and were made possible by development of a new generation of computers such as the Titan.

In 1971, Sir Martin Ryle described why, in the late 1950s, radio astronomers at MRAO decided on the construction of the new One Mile telescope: "Our object was twofold. First we wanted to extend the range of our observations far back in time to the earliest days of the Universe, and this required a large increase in both sensitivity and resolution. With greater resolution we hoped that we might be able to draw radio maps of individual radio sources with sufficient detail to give some indication of the physical processes which brought them into being."

One of the One Mile Telescope dishes was temporarily used to improve the resolution of MERLIN (then MTRLI) from 1987 until Autumn 1990.

== Technical innovations ==
The One-Mile Telescope was the first telescope to use Earth-rotation aperture synthesis (described by Ryle as "super-synthesis") and the first to give radio maps with a resolution better than that of the human eye. The telescope was made up of three 120 ton dishes, each of which is 18 m in diameter. Two of the dishes are fixed, while the third can be moved along an 800 m-long (half mile) rail track, at speeds of up to 6.4 km/h. There were 60 different stations along the track, which is straight to within 0.9 cm, and whose far end was raised by 5 cm to allow for the curvature of the Earth over its length. The observing frequencies were usually 408 MHz (75 cm; the resolution was 80 arcsec) and 1.4 GHz (21 cm; the resolution was 20 arcsec, three times better than that of the unaided eye).

== Notable achievements ==
Over a 20-year career, the telescope was used to map individual objects, and to do several deep field surveys. Though still occasionally used, it is now essentially retired (one of the dishes is occasionally used for undergraduate projects or by amateur radio astronomers).

The construction of this telescope and development of the Earth-rotation aperture synthesis used when operating it contributed to Martin Ryle and Antony Hewish receiving the Nobel Prize for Physics in 1974.
