= Mullard Radio Astronomy Observatory =

Observatory in the United Kingdom

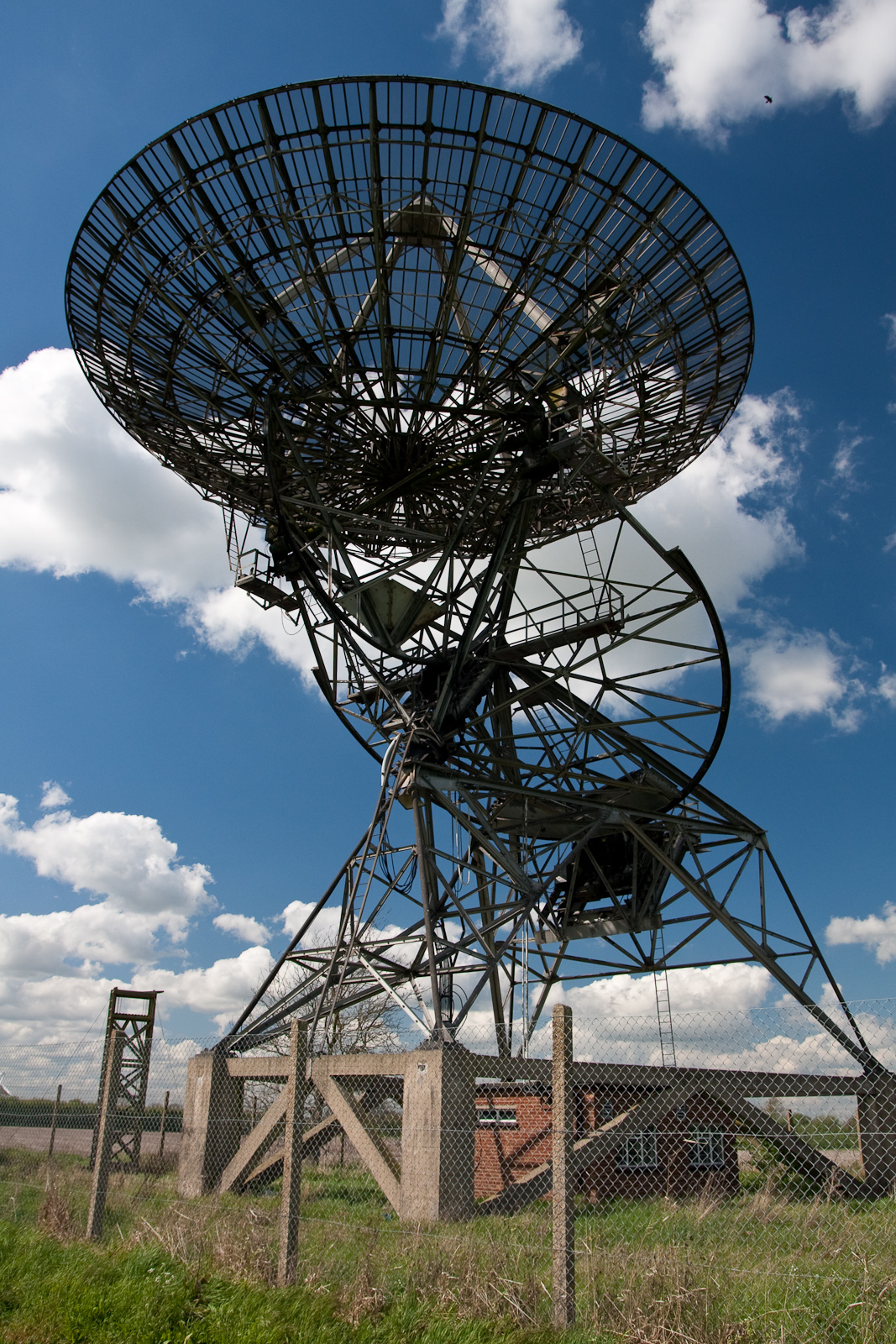
- Named after: Mullard
- Location: United Kingdom
- Coordinates: 52°10′03″N 0°01′57″E
- Telescopes: 4C Array; Arcminute Microkelvin Imager; Cambridge Low Frequency Synthesis Telescope; Cambridge Optical Aperture Synthesis Telescope; Half-Mile Telescope; Interplanetary Scintillation Array; One-Mile Telescope; Ryle Telescope
- Location of Mullard Radio Astronomy Observatory
- Related media on Commons

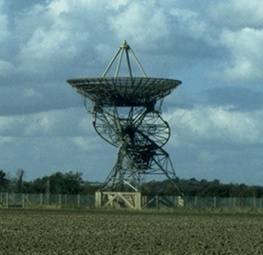
West aerial of the One-Mile Telescope at MRAO

The Mullard Radio Astronomy Observatory (MRAO) is located near Cambridge, UK and is home to a number of the largest and most advanced aperture synthesis radio telescopes in the world, including the One-Mile Telescope, 5-km Ryle Telescope, and the Arcminute Microkelvin Imager. It was founded by the University of Cambridge and is part of the Cambridge University, Cavendish Laboratories, Astrophysics Department.

== History ==
Radio interferometry started in the mid-1940s on the outskirts of Cambridge, but with funding from the Science Research Council and a corporate donation of £100,000 from Mullard Limited, a leading commercial manufacturer of thermionic valves.

Construction of the Mullard Radio Astronomy Observatory commenced at Lords Bridge Air Ammunition Park, a few kilometres to the west of Cambridge.

The observatory was founded under Martin Ryle of the Radio-Astronomy Group of the Cavendish Laboratory, University of Cambridge and was opened by Sir Edward Victor Appleton on 25 July 1957. This group is now known as the Cavendish Astrophysics Group.

== Location ==
The observatory is located a few miles south-west of Cambridge at Harlton on a former ordnance storage site, next to the disused Oxford-Cambridge Varsity railway line.

A portion of the track bed of the railway, running nearly east-west for several miles, was used to form the main part of the "5km" radio-telescope and the Cambridge Low Frequency Synthesis Telescope. Due to this, the reconstruction of the railway line between Oxford and Cambridge will follow a new alignment at this point.

== Telescopes ==
Telescope	Year built	Status
Arcminute Microkelvin Imager Large Array	2007	Active
Arcminute Microkelvin Imager Small Array	2004	Active
Very Small Array (moved to Tenerife in 1999)	1998	Active
Cosmic Anisotropy Telescope made first high-resolution maps of Cosmic Microwave Background fluctuations	1995	Decommissioned
Cambridge Optical Aperture Synthesis Telescope (COAST) first aperture synthesis at optical wavelengths	1993	Operated on clear nights
One receiver from the e-MERLIN array	1990	Active
Cambridge Low Frequency Synthesis Telescope (CLFST)	1980	Decommissioned
Ryle Telescope (formerly 5-Kilometre Telescope)	1971	Decommissioned (repurposed for AMI LA in 2006)
Half-Mile Telescope	1968	Decommissioned
Interplanetary Scintillation Array discovered first pulsar	1967	Decommissioned
One-Mile Telescope	1964	Decommissioned
4C Array, first telescope at the Cambridge's new observatory, used to make the 4C catalogue	1958	Decommissioned

== Gallery ==
The following photographs (except for the last 2 items) were taken in June 2014:

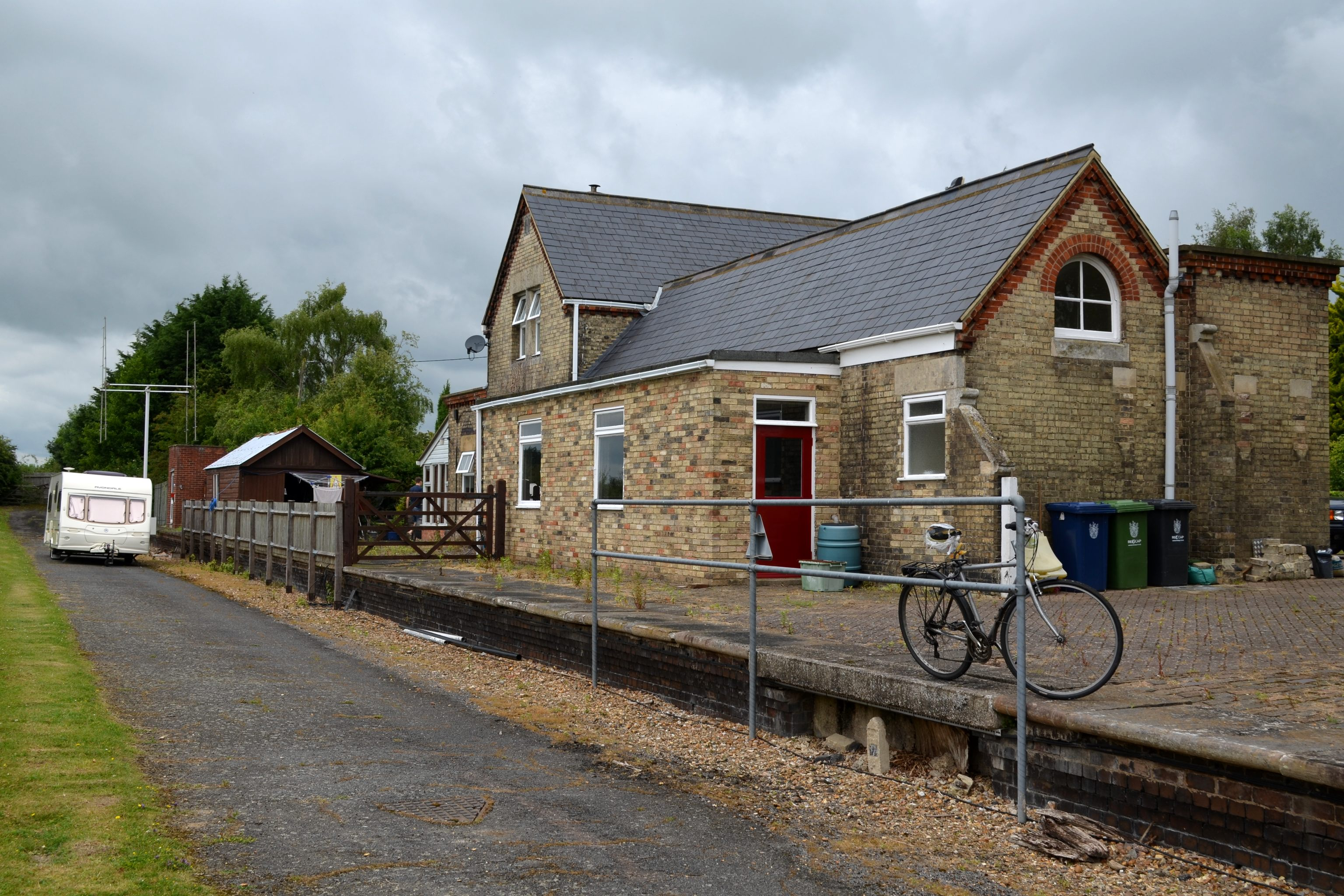
Platform and Lecture Room formerly part of Lord's Bridge Railway Station

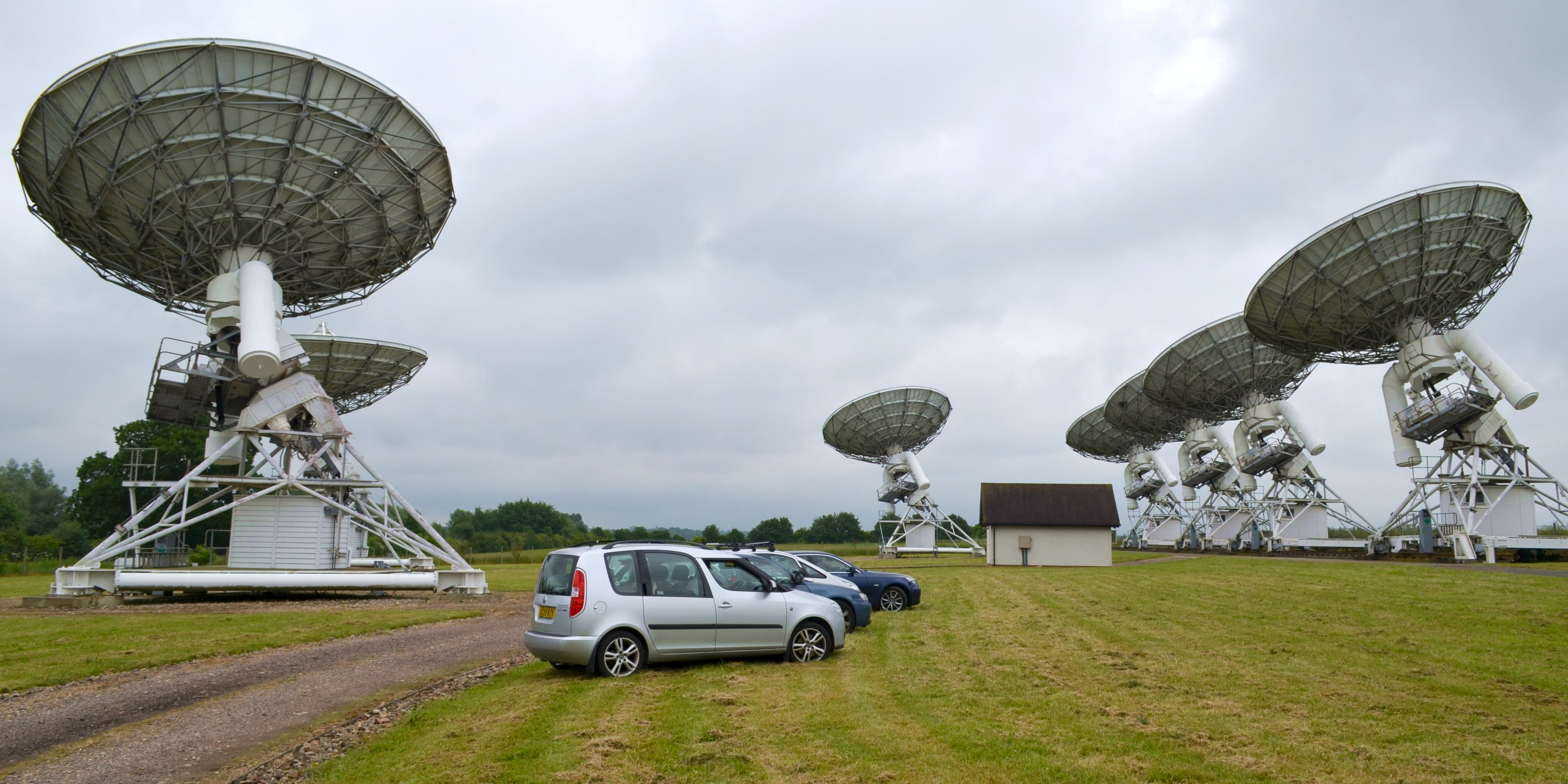
Arcminute Microkelvin Imager - Large Array (AMI-LA)

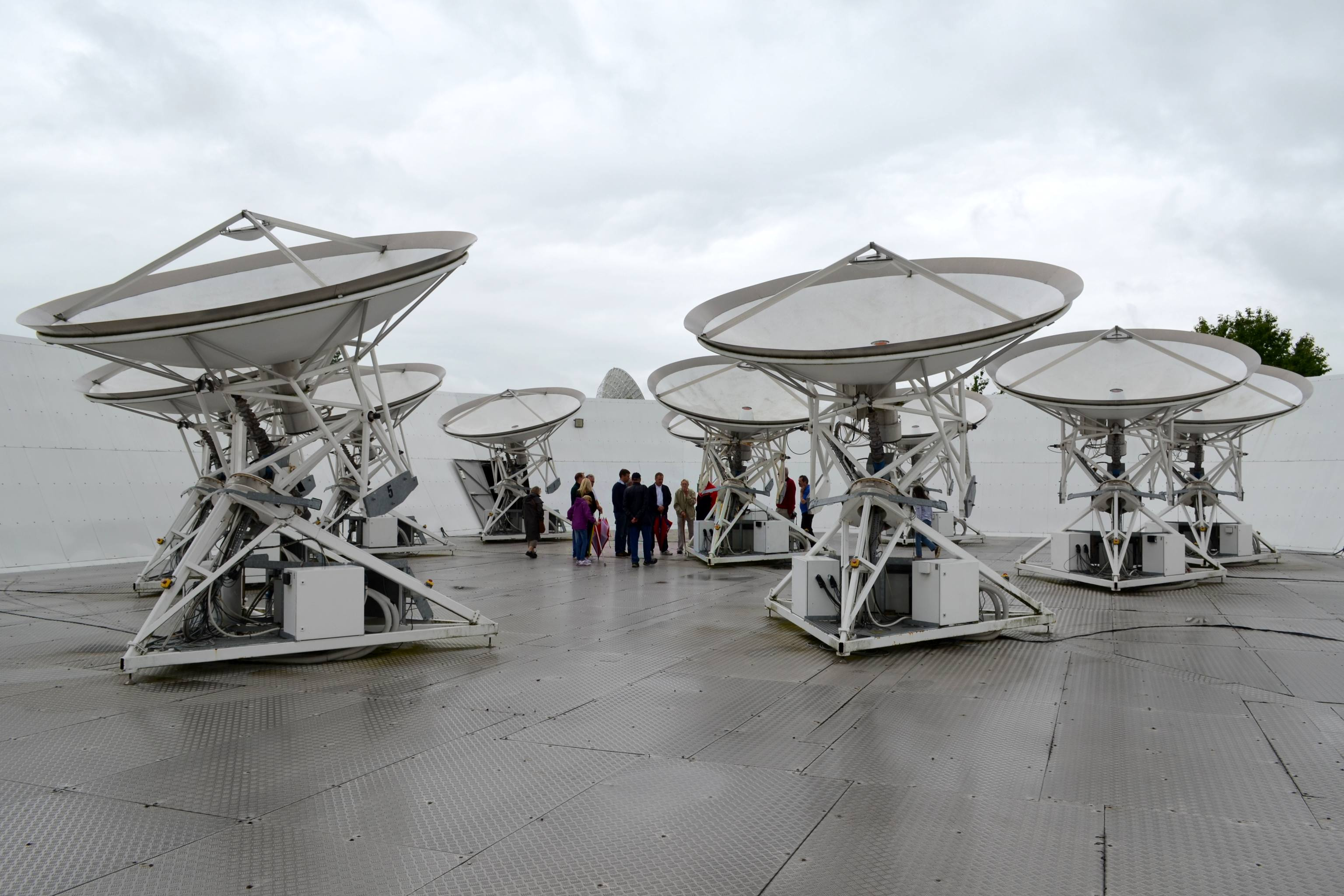
Arcminute Microkelvin Imager - Small Array (AMI-SA)

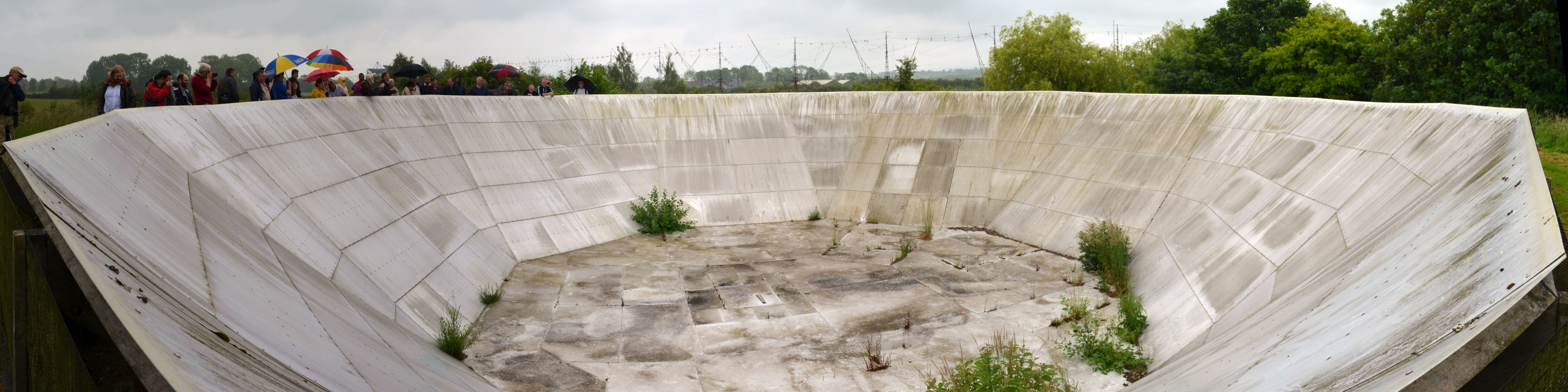
Stitched panorama of the Cosmic Anisotropy Telescope enclosure

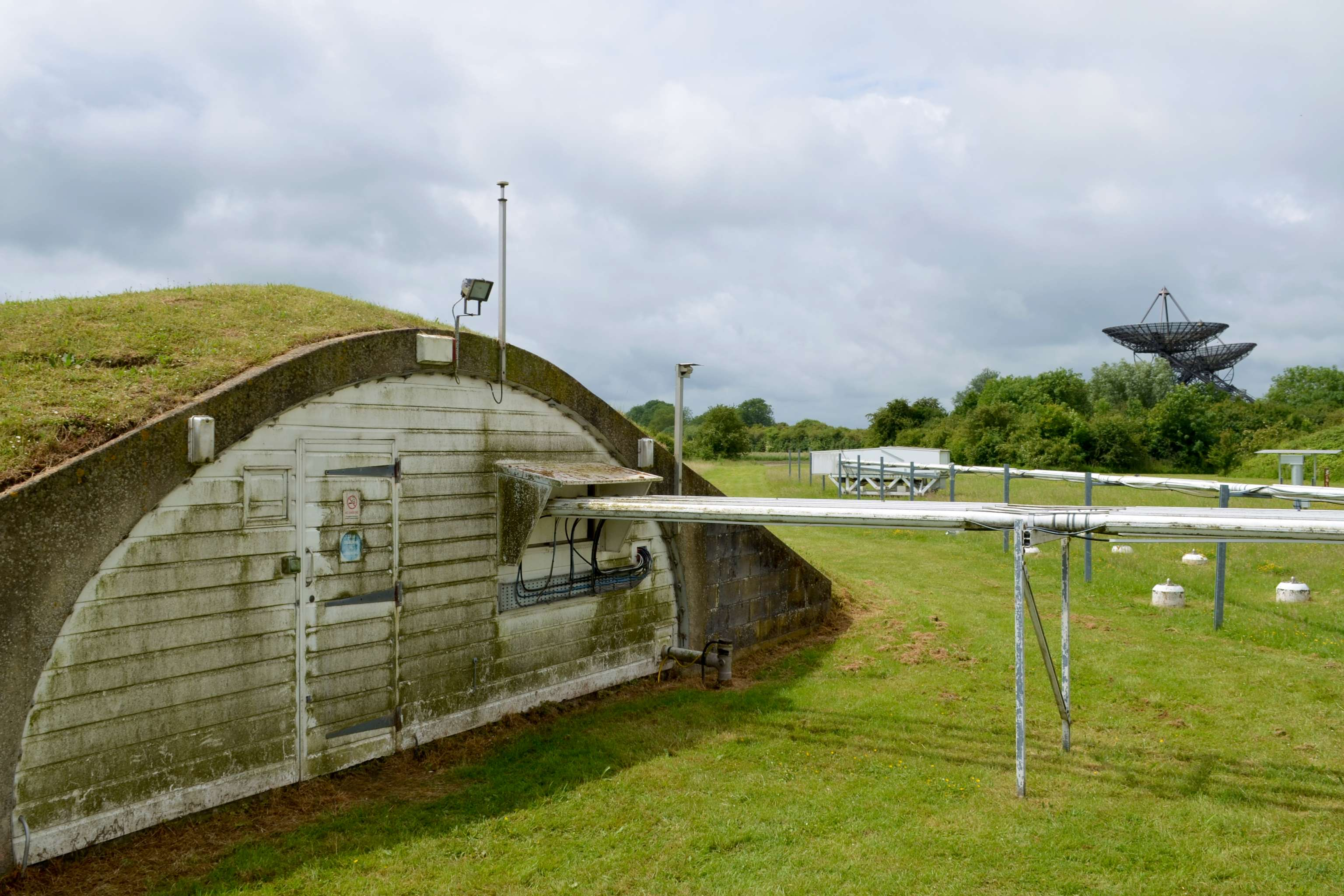
Part of the Cambridge Optical Aperture Synthesis Telescope

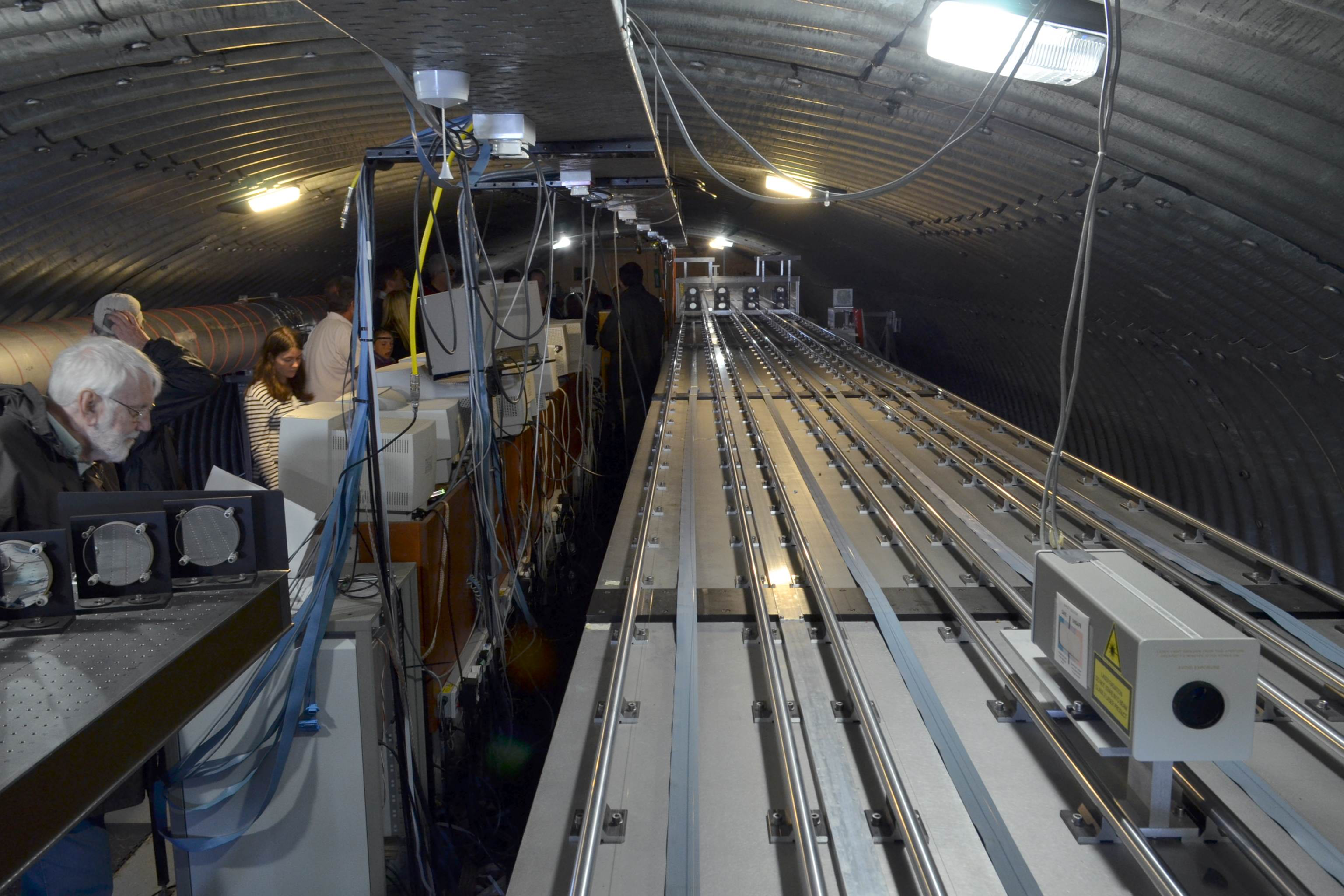
The interior of the bunker of the Cambridge Optical Aperture Synthesis Telescope

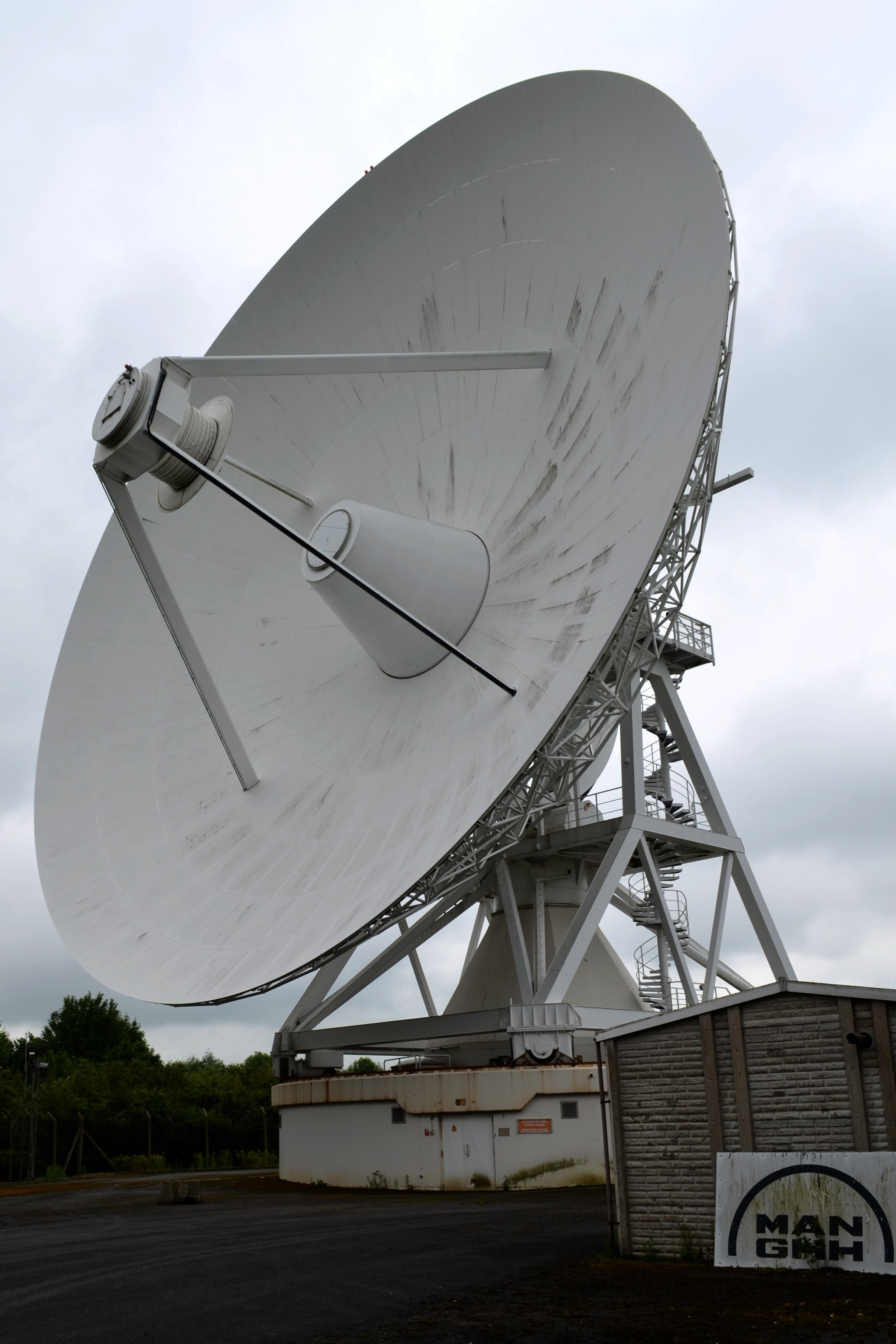
The receiver from the e-MERLIN array

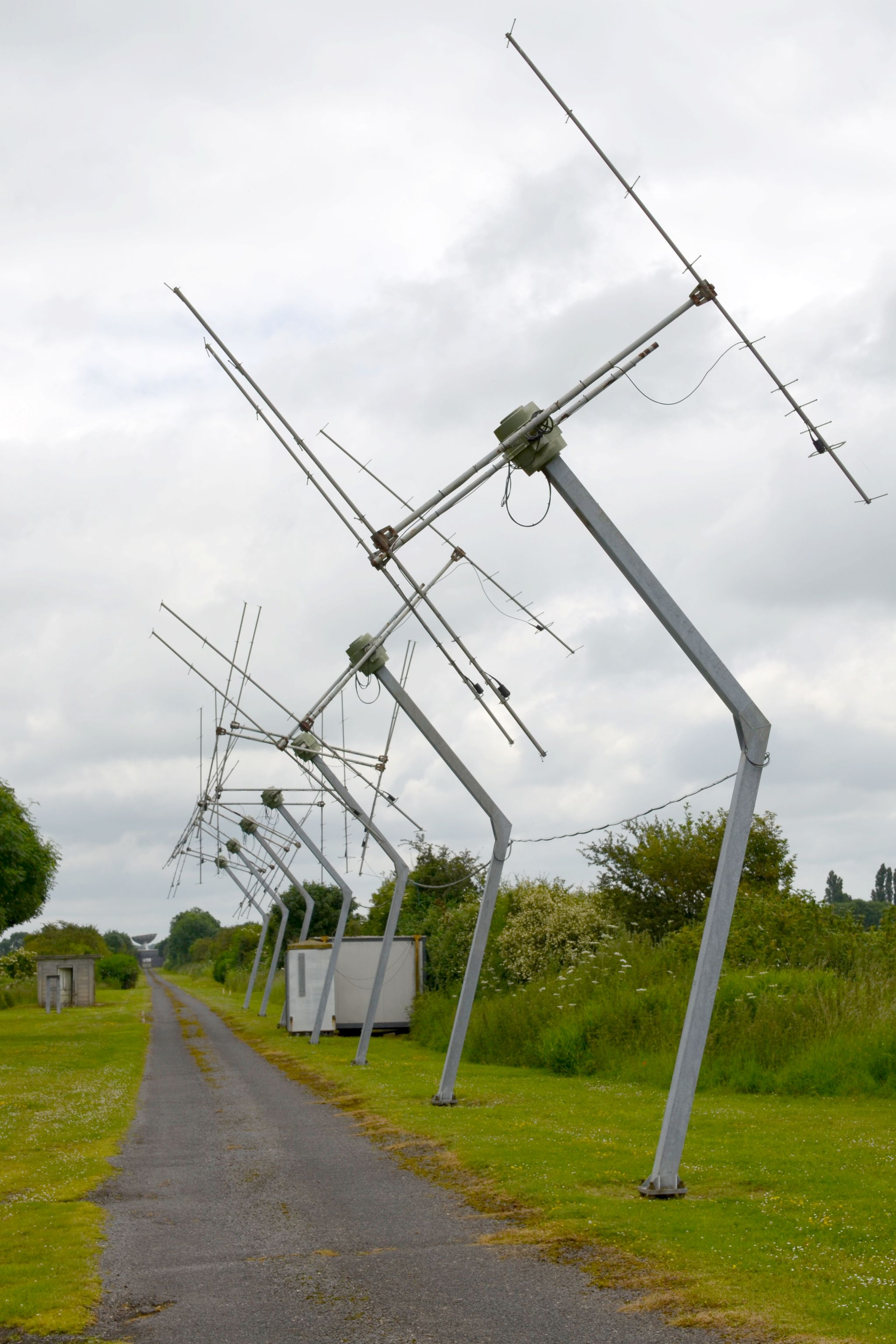
Surviving Yagi antennas of the Cambridge Low Frequency Synthesis Telescope

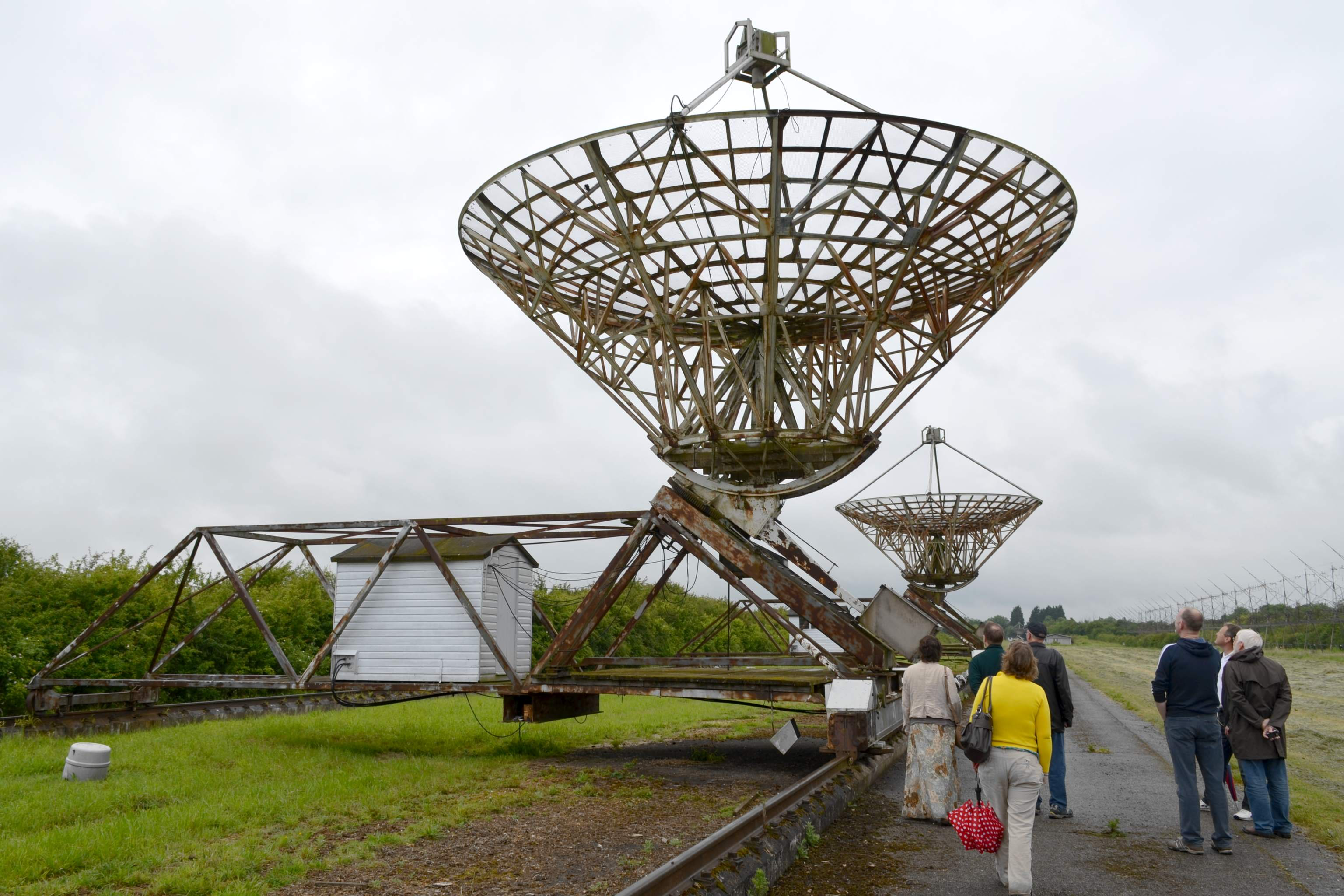
Two Half-Mile Telescopes

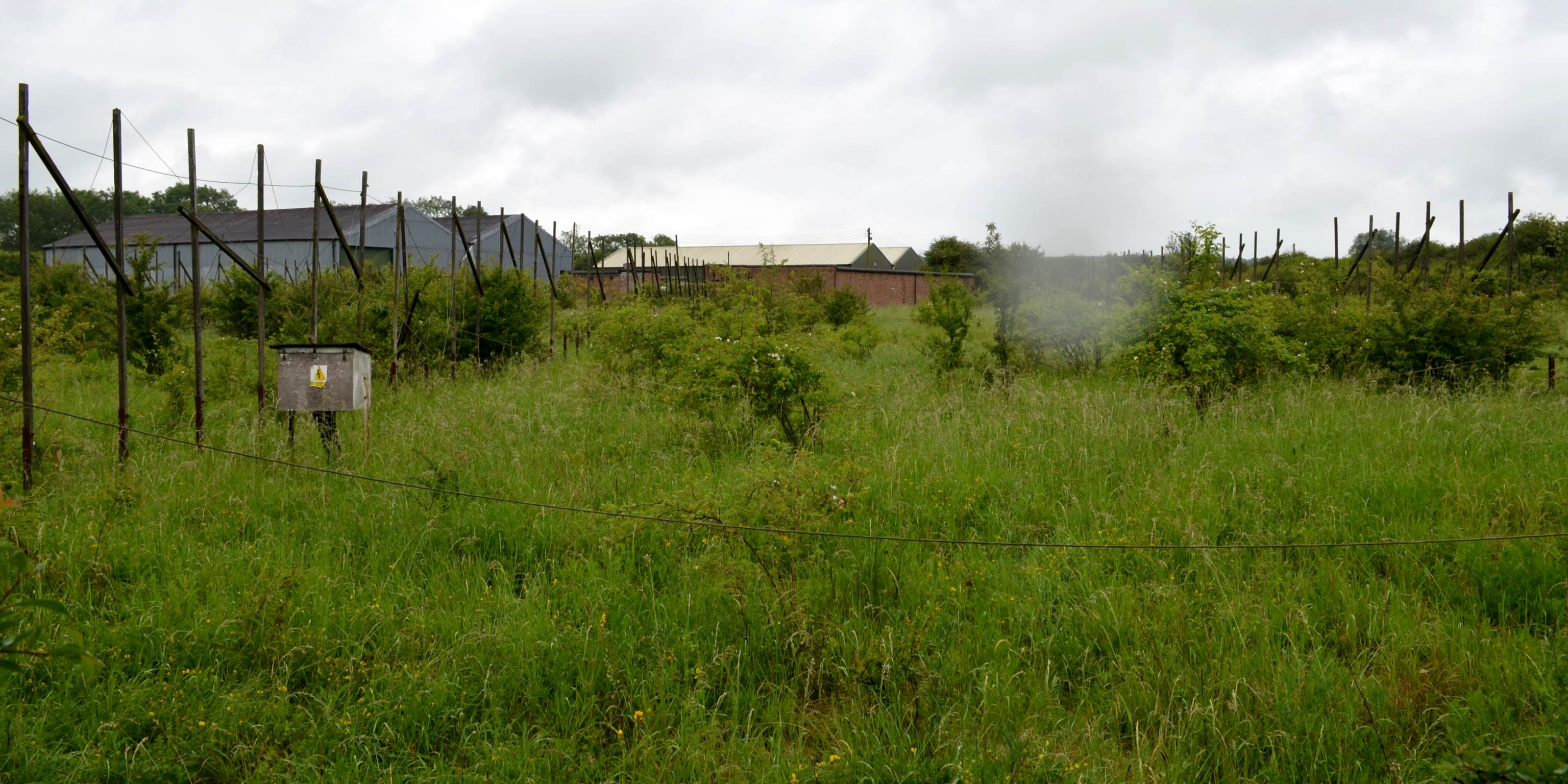
Remains of the Interplanetary Scintillation Array

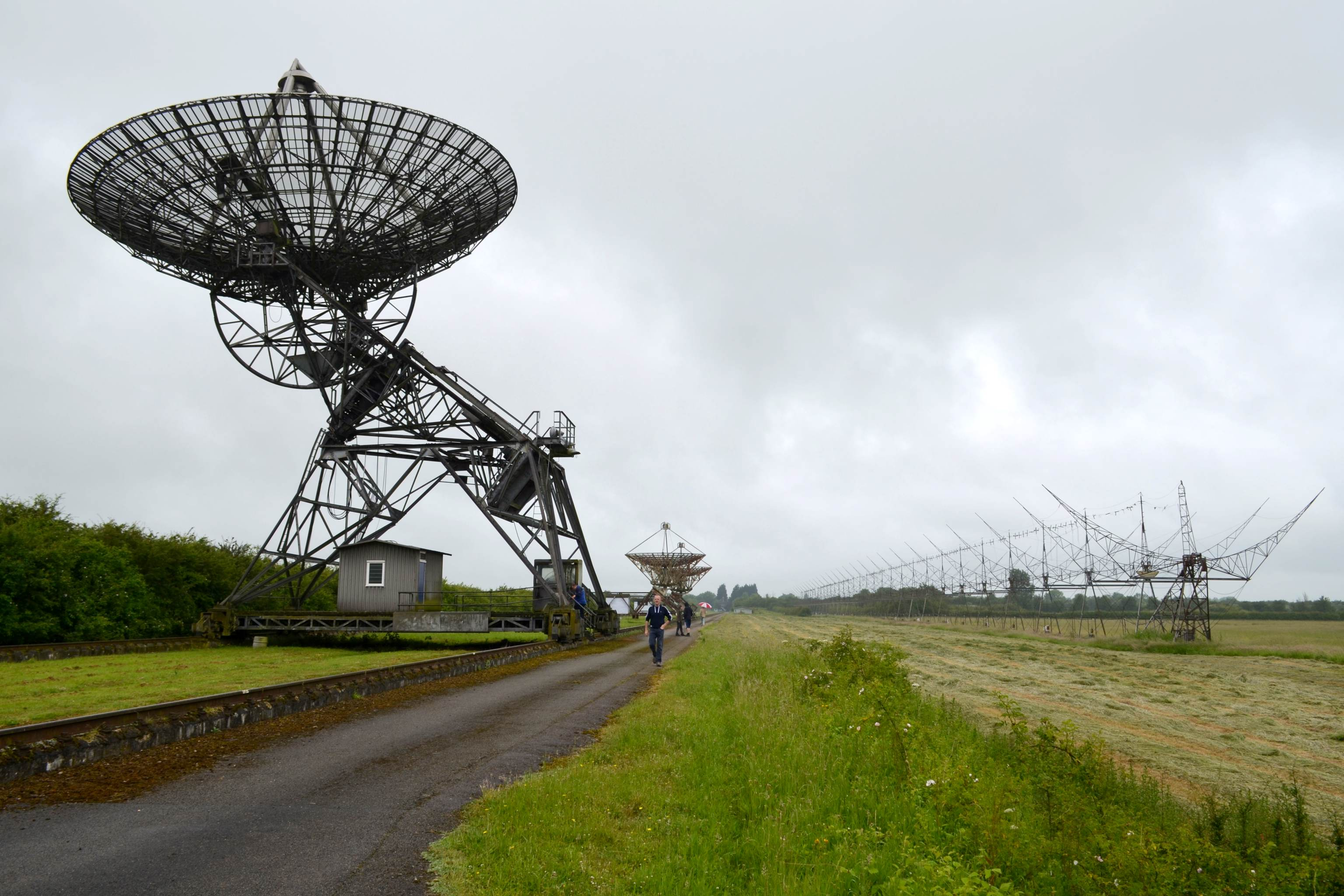
One-Mile Telescope (left), two of the Half-Mile Telescope (centre) and the remains of the 4C Array (right)

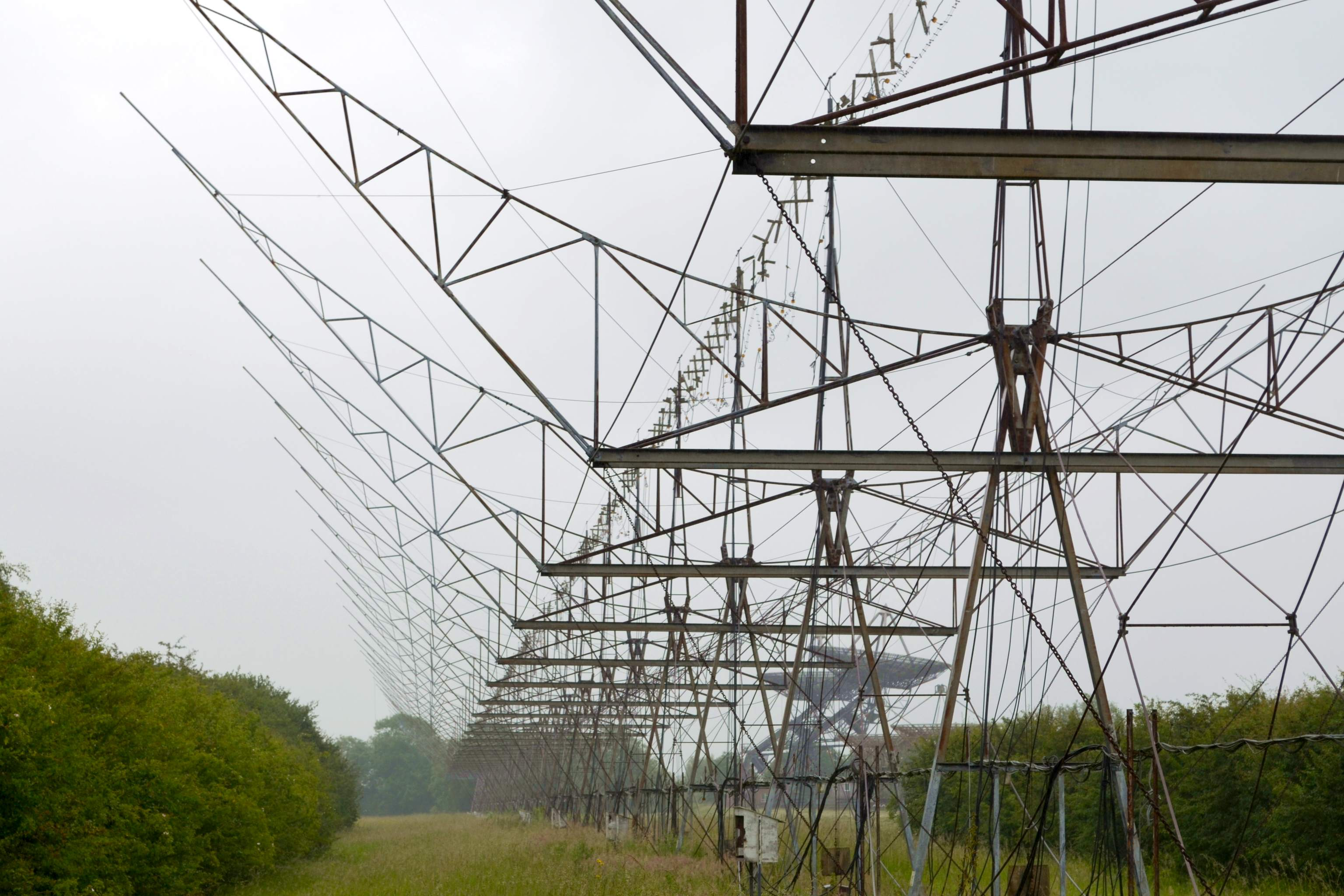
Remains of the 4C Array, with One-Mile Telescope in the background

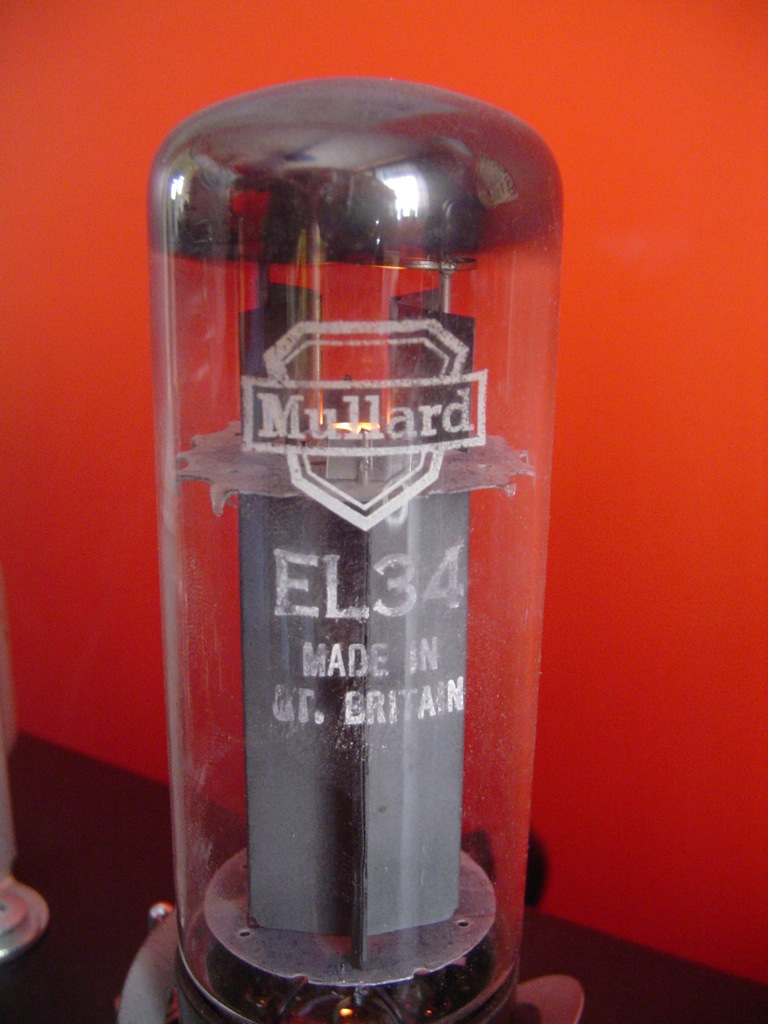
Mullard EL34 Power Pentode. Mullard produced up to 40% of thermionic valves used by Britain during 1939-1945 War

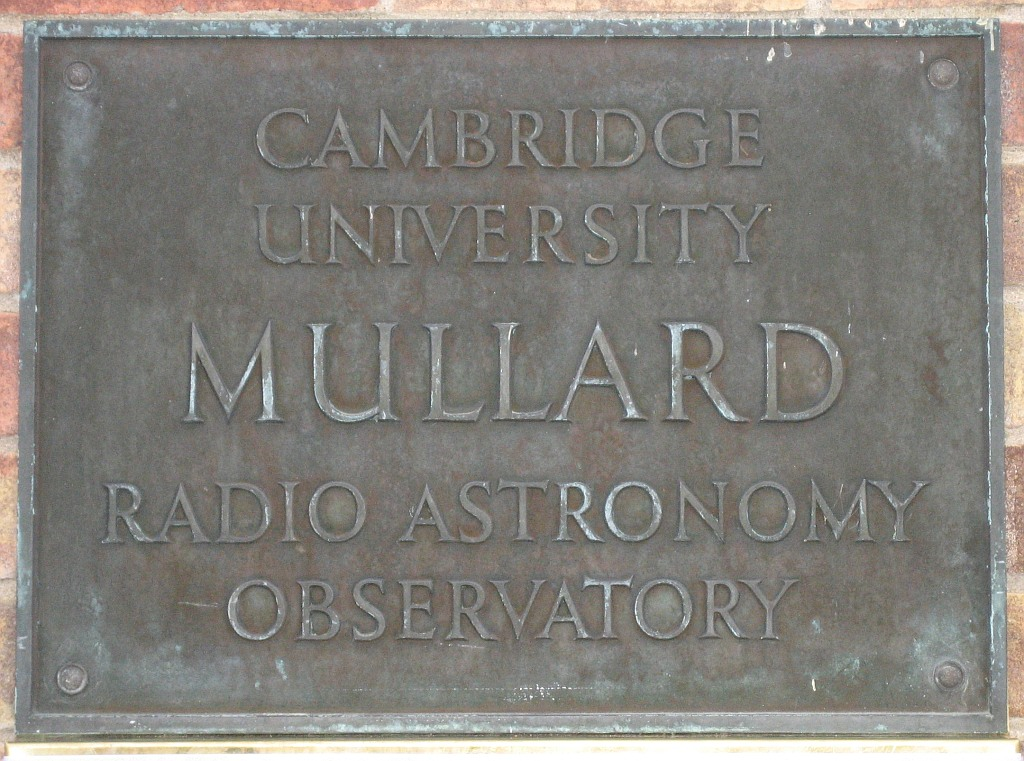
Mullard Radio Astronomy Observatory plaque
