= 5C =

5C or 5c may refer to:

- 5C Situation analysis: Company, Competitors, Customers, Collaborators, Climate
- 5-C (Five County), an Idaho juvenile detention center for high-risk individuals
- CAL Cargo Air Lines IATA code
- Chromosome Conformation Capture Carbon Copy, or 5C, an extension of the Chromosome conformation capture (3C) method used in genomics
- Fifth Cambridge Survey of Radio Sources
- Five Cs of Singapore, a cultural term relating to materialism
- Five-cent coin
- La Cinquième Couche, Belgian independent comics publisher
- The consortium of the five Claremont Colleges
- Five Company (5C) Digital Transmission Content Protection
- The iPhone 5C, a smartphone designed and marketed by Apple Inc.

== See also ==
- VC (disambiguation)
- C5 (disambiguation)
- 5 Cs (disambiguation)
