= C5a =

C5a or C-5A may refer to:

- C5a receptor, a receptor for complement component 5a
- Complement component 5a, a human protein fragment, a chemotactic factor
- C5a peptidase, an enzyme
- the "A" version of the Lockheed C-5 Galaxy, a large military transport aircraft

== See also ==
- C5 (disambiguation)
