= VC =

VC may refer to:

== Military decorations ==
- Victoria Cross, a military decoration awarded by the United Kingdom and other Commonwealth nations
  - Victoria Cross for Australia
  - Victoria Cross (Canada)
  - Victoria Cross for New Zealand
- Victorious Cross, Idi Amin's self-bestowed military decoration

== Organizations ==
- Ocean Airlines (IATA airline designator 2003–2008), Italian cargo airline
- Voyageur Airways (IATA airline designator since 1968), Canadian charter airline
- Visual Communications, an Asian-Pacific-American media arts organization in Los Angeles, California
- Viet Cong, a political and military organization during the Vietnam War (1959–1975)

=== Education ===
- Vanier College, Canada
- Vassar College, US
- Velez College, Philippines
- Virginia College, US
- Ventura College, US

== Places ==
- Saint Vincent and the Grenadines (ISO country code)
- Sri Lanka (ICAO airport prefix code)
- Watsonian vice-counties, subdivisions of Great Britain or Ireland
- Ventura County, in Southern California

== Science and technology ==
- Vomiting center (area postrema), a structure in the brain
- Vital capacity, a measure of lung function

=== Chemistry ===
- Vanadium carbide, an inorganic compound
- Vinyl chloride, a chemical used in the production of PVC
- Victorium, a mixture of the elements gadolinium and terbium
- Vitamin C

=== Computing and telecommunications ===
- .vc, the top level Internet domain for Saint Vincent and the Grenadines
- VC dimension (Vapnik–Chervonenkis dimension), a measure of the capacity of a statistical classification algorithm
- Vapnik–Chervonenkis theory, a computational learning theory
- Version control in software development
- VideoCore, a processor architecture
- Videoconferencing
- Voice chat in online gaming
- Virtual circuit, a telecommunications arrangement
- Virtual console, software emulation of a computer terminal
- Virtual container, a networking concept within the SDH/SONET multiplexing architecture
- Microsoft Visual C++, a software development tool produced by Microsoft
- Volkov Commander, a computer program for managing files

== Transportation ==
- Holden Commodore (VC), an automobile introduced by Holden in 1980
- Cruising speed, or V_{C}, in aircraft design

== Sports ==
- Vancouver Canucks, an NHL Canadian hockey team
- Vince Carter (born 1977), American professional basketball player

== Other uses ==
- Venture capital, financing of growing businesses
- Vi coactus (V.C., in Latin: "force coacted"), a handwritten signal made on a signed document
- Vice-Chancellor, the chief executive of a university
- The Victoria Cross, a British silent film directed by Harold M. Shaw
- Vietcong (video game)
- Viet Cong (or VC), a card game, see Tiến lên
- Virtual Console, a Nintendo video game download service for the Wii, 3DS, and Wii U game consoles

== See also ==
- Vitrified clay pipe (VCP), clay and shale pipe
- VSee, a video chat and screen-sharing software tool
- Viet Cong (disambiguation)
- 95 (disambiguation)
- V100 (disambiguation)
- 5C (disambiguation)
- VCS (disambiguation)
