= B2 1308+326 =

BL Lacertae object in the constellation Canes Venatici

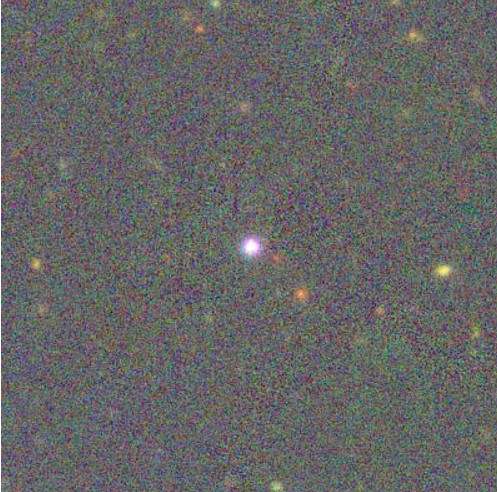
- The BL Lac object B2 1308+326.

Observation data (J2000.0 epoch)
- Constellation: Canes Venatici
- Right ascension: 13^{h} 10^{m} 28.6638^{s}
- Declination: +32° 20′ 43.783″
- Redshift: 0.997
- Heliocentric radial velocity: 503,199 km/s
- Apparent magnitude (V): 15.24
- Apparent magnitude (B): 15.61

Characteristics
- Type: Opt var; FSRQ, BL LAC

Other designations
- IRAS F13080+3237, OHIO P 313, US 371, QSO B1308+326, CSO 836, INTREF 546, NVSS J131028+322044, V* AU CVn, H-ATLAS J131028.7+322043, 5C 12.659, 7C 1308+3236, 2E 2979, B2 1308+32

B2 1308+326 known as OP 313 or AU CVn, is a BL Lacertae object located in the constellation of Canes Venatici. It has a redshift of (z) 0.997 and was initially discovered as a variable star in 1959 before being identified with its optical counterpart in 1972. Its radio spectrum is flat, making it a FSRQ (flat-spectrum radio quasar).

== Description ==
B2 1308+326 is found variable on the electromagnetic spectrum. It is classified a blazar although some studies described it as a transitional or change-looking due to it experiencing a shift in synchrotron peak frequencies. It is known to show an outburst in 1978 which it displayed extreme degrees of polarization, found rapidly variable in both position and degree angles on a time scale for 15 minutes.

A gamma ray flare was detected in 2014. In June 2022, B2 1308+326 showed an optical flare, subsequently reaching a historic maximum brightness with a slight decreased flux of 0.2-0.3 magnitude in R-band observed a month later. Significant gamma ray activity was detected on 1 December 2023.

Radio imaging of B2 1308+326 made by Very long baseline interferometry at 5 GHz showed it has an extended region and simple radio core structure measuring 1.3 x 0.6 in size with an orientation along the 30° position angle. When shown at 8.4 GHz, the source is then resolved into a bright core with a brightness temperature of 10^{12} Kelvin and a jet structure. Subsequent observations found the core has a 3% polarization with a flat spectrum and contains perpendicular electric field vectors to the jet's direction which turns almost parallel upon 2 mas from the core. Imaging by Very Large Array showed it has a dominant component and secondary component located 12 arcseconds north as well as a diffused halo surrounding the structure.

A light curve of B2 1308+326 during 10 years of observations between 1976 and 1986 was obtained. Data from the light curve showed the total variability range of B2 1308+326 was 3.0 magnitude with the detection of multiple flares. According to observations in early 1987, it was found to be a faint state. The light curve at 4.8–90 GHz frequencies also showed B2 1308+326 had two complex outbursts, one between 1980-1988 and the second between 1988 and 2001 accompanied by three flares.
