= 4C 34.07 =

Quasar in the constellation Triangulum

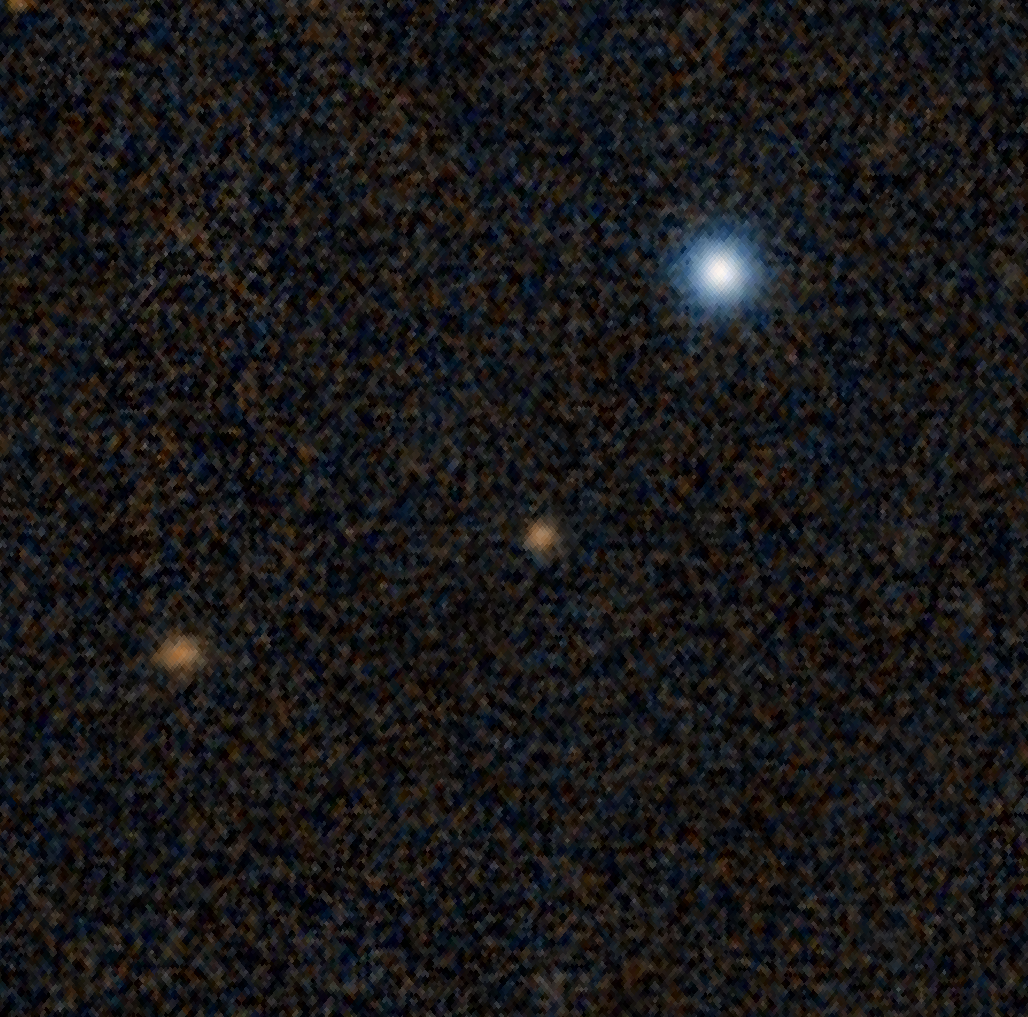
- Pan-STARRS image of 4C 34.07

Observation data (J2000.0 epoch)
- Constellation: Triangulum
- Right ascension: 02^{h} 26^{m} 10.33^{s}
- Declination: +34° 21′ 30.28″
- Redshift: 2.910000
- Heliocentric radial velocity: 872,396 km/s
- Distance: 11.6 Gly
- Apparent magnitude (B): 21.3

Characteristics
- Type: GPS/CSS b

Other designations
- B2 0223+34, LEDA 2820338, NVSS J022610+342130, 5C 06.291, 6C B022309.9+340807, S4 0223+34, IERS B0223+341, ICRF J022610.3+342130

4C 34.07 is a quasar located in the constellation of Triangulum. First documented as a radio source in 1967, the object displays a flat radio spectrum and was later identified with a stellar object through another study published in 1981. The redshift of the quasar at that time was unknown until the 7C survey confirmed its redshift as (z) 2.910.

== Description ==
4C 34.07 is classified as a strong compact steep spectrum (CSS) source. It is surrounded by a large extended halo structure which contributes 20% of the flux at the frequencies of 1.67 GHz. Evidence also showed the quasar has significant flux density variations indicating the source has interstellar scintillations. The spectrum of the source at low frequencies displays steepening with the maximum value of between 300-500 MHz.

Radio imaging made with MERLIN shows the source is a triple asymmetric. When imaged with Very Long Baseline Interferometry (VLBI) at 18 centimeters, it is found to display radio emission on compact scales with small faint knot features located towards the direction of a southwest radio lobe. Another observation by VLBI in 2008, showed the source has a bright radio core dominating it, a radio lobe extending west with another weaker radio lobe in a northern direction and a hot spot that is partially resolved, being located between the western lobe and the core. Studies published in 2013 show the lobes of the source are polarized, with a depolarized northern component in the frequency range between 23.2 and 15 GHz. However, the polarization percentage is relatively constant, in the middle of 15 and 8.0 GHz.

New VLBI observations in 2013 at 5 GHz found there is an eastern compact region in the quasar. The region displays a complicated morphology made up two dominant bright knots located in at the tips of the northern and eastern structures, separating from each other by 79 parsecs. At the southern direction of the source, several blob features are evident which points in the direction of its western lobe. A central compact component is found, hosting 16 MJy of the flux density and has a distance of 68 milliarcseconds from another component with its position angle positioned at 43°. 327 GHz VLBI imaging shows the structure mainly being dominated by a component positioned between two features described as extended. A southern component, interpreted as the jet, is seen ending in the direction of a possible hot spot feature in the west.
