= V100 =

V100 may refer to:

== Radio stations ==
- KDVV V100, in Topeka, Kansas, US
- WKKV-FM, in Milwaukee, Wisconsin, US
- WVAF, in Charleston, West Virginia, US

== Technology ==
- Lenovo 3000 V100, a computer designed by Lenovo Group
- Motorola V100, a phone by Motorola
- Tesla V100, an Nvidia GPU
- Sun Fire V100, a Sun Fire computer by Sun Microsystems

== Transportation and military ==
- Cadillac Gage V-100 Commando, an American armored car used widely in the Vietnam War
- DB Class V 100, a West German class of diesel locomotive
- DR Class V 100, an East German class of diesel locomotive
- Kamov V-100, a projected twin-rotor compound helicopter combat aircraft from Kamov
- Vought V-100, an attempt to produce an export version of the Vought O2U/O3U observation aircraft
- SMS V 100, a B 97-class destroyer (1914–15), a World War I era German navy destroyer

== Other uses ==
- AdvoCare V100 Bowl (disambiguation), a series of bowl games sponsored by AdvoCare
- ESP LTD V-100, a guitar manufactured by ESP
