= C5 =

C5, C05, C V or C-5 may refer to:

== Military use ==
- Lockheed C-5 Galaxy, a military transport aircraft
- C-5 North Star, a 1940s Canadian military aircraft
- HMS C5, a 1906 British Royal Navy C-class submarine
- Spanish submarine C-5, a Spanish Navy C-class submarine
- USS C-5 (SS-16), a 1908 United States Navy C-class submarine
- USS San Francisco (C-5), an 1889 United States Navy protected cruiser
- Albatros C.V, a World War I German military reconnaissance aircraft
- AEG C.V, a World War I prototype German two-seat biplane reconnaissance aircraft
- DFW C.V, a World War I German military reconnaissance aircraft
- Fokker C.V, a 1924 Dutch light reconnaissance and bomber biplane aircraft
- Halberstadt C.V, a World War I German single-engined reconnaissance biplane
- Fokker C-5, an American military version of the Fokker F.VII aircraft
- SM UC-5, a 1915 German Type UC I U-boat
- C-5 (blimp), a United States Navy airship that attempted a trans-Atlantic flight in 1919

== Transport, vehicles, roads, public transport routes ==
=== Road ===
- C5 automatic, a successor to Ford C4 transmission
- Chevrolet Corvette C5, the fifth generation of the Chevrolet Corvette sports car
- Citroën C5, a car manufactured by Citroën
- Omoda C5, a car manufactured by Chery
- Sauber C5, a sportscar by Sauber
- Audi A6 (C5), the second generation of the Audi A6 built from 1997 to 2004
- Sinclair C5, an electric vehicle designed by Clive Sinclair
- Circumferential Road 5 or C-5, an arterial road of Manila, Philippines

=== Air travel and aircraft vehicles ===
- Kinner C-5, an American five cylinder radial engine for small aircraft of the 1930s
- Spartan C5, a passenger and utility aircraft produced in the United States in the early 1930s

=== Rail ===
- Bavarian C V, an 1899 German express train locomotive model
- WLWR Class C5, a Waterford, Limerick and Western Railway Irish steam locomotive
- Finnish Steam Locomotive Class C5
- LNER Class C5, a class of British steam locomotives

=== Other ===
- Crown C-5, a series of forklifts by the Crown Equipment Corporation
- Saturn C-5, an American man-rated expendable rocket

== Biology ==
- Cervical vertebra 5, one of the cervical vertebrae of the vertebral column
- Cervical spinal nerve 5
- Complement component 5, a protein of the complement system
  - C5-convertase, an enzyme which splits C5 into C5b
  - Complement component 5a, an inflammatory peptide
- ATC code C05 Vasoprotectives, a subgroup of the Anatomical Therapeutic Chemical Classification System
- C05, Malignant neoplasm of palate ICD-10 code

== Other uses ==
- C5 (classification), a Paralympic cycling classification
- C5 Envelope size
- C5, a decision tree learning algorithm
- C5 Generic Collection Library for C Sharp and CLI, a software library by Niels Kokholm and Peter Sestoft
- C5 line socket, a polarised, three pole, mains voltage IEC appliance connector
- ChorusOS, a computer operating system
- C5, CommutAir IATA code
- C5 or Tenor C, a musical note
- c5, a square of the chessboard using algebraic chess notation
- Microsoft Dynamics C5, enterprise resource planning software
- Channel 5 (disambiguation)
- Nokia C5 (disambiguation), a series of smartphones
- Caldwell 5 (IC 342), an intermediate spiral galaxy in Camelopardalis
- Concrete5, an open source content management system
- A line of earphones from Bowers & Wilkins
- Tha Carter V, a 2018 album by Lil Wayne
- Central 5, an informal political cooperation between Austria, the Czech Republic, Hungary, Slovakia, and Slovenia
- C_{5}, the cycle graph with 5 vertices
- Samsung Galaxy C5, an Android-based smartphone by Samsung

== See also ==
- CV (disambiguation)
- 5C (disambiguation)
