= IC 4040 =

Galaxy in the constellation Coma Berenices

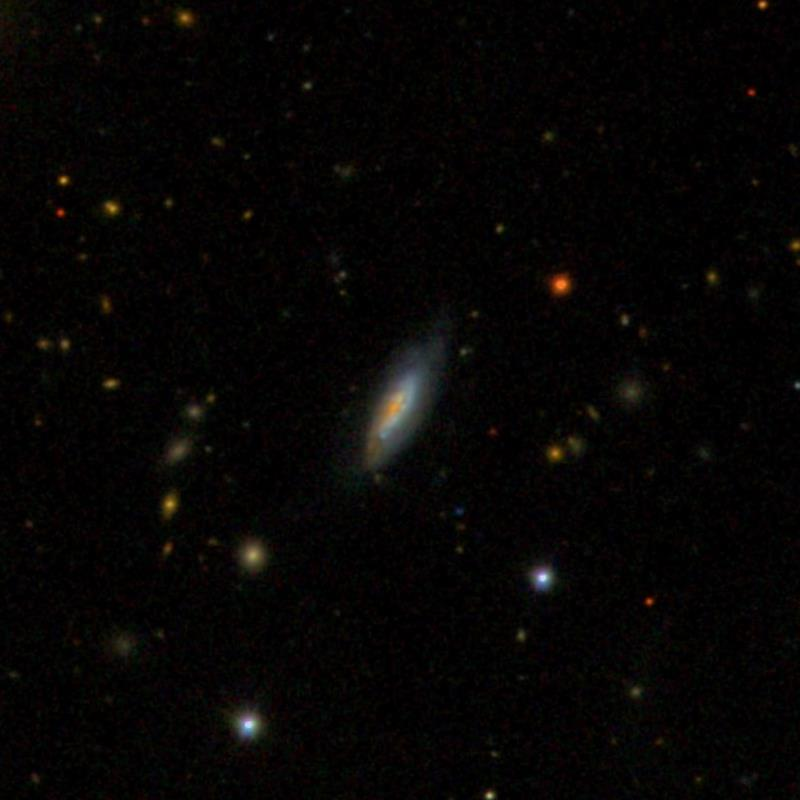
- Sloan Digital Sky Survey of IC 4040

Observation data (J2000 epoch)
- Constellation: Coma Berenices
- Right ascension: 13h 00m 37.9s
- Declination: +28d 03m 26.50s
- Redshift: 0.025530
- Heliocentric radial velocity: 7,556 km/s
- Distance: 353 Mly (108.2 Mpc)
- Group or cluster: Coma Cluster
- Apparent magnitude (V): 14.76

Characteristics
- Type: Sdm, HII
- Size: 105,000 ly

Other designations
- PGC 44789, CGCG 160-252, MCG +05-31-085, 2MASX J13003794+2803266, 74W 019, SDSS J130037.78+280326.8, IRAS F12582+2819, CG 0954, NSA 162814, 5C 04.108, NVSS J130037+280323, WBL 426-106, AGC 221406, FOCA 0388, LEDA 44789

IC 4040 is a type SABc spiral galaxy with a bar in Coma Berenices. It is located 353 million light-years away from the Solar System and has an estimated diameter of 105,000 light-years making it slightly larger than the Milky Way. IC 4040 was discovered on April 12, 1891, by Guillaume Bigourdan and is a member of the Coma Cluster.

== Characteristics ==
IC 4040 is considered a jellyfish galaxy due to its close proximity to the cluster where gas is stripped from the galaxy by the action of ram pressure. A radio continuum tail can be seen extending outwards from the galaxy, showing widespread occurrence of relativistic electrons and magnetic fields which is being removed by pressure. The stripped electrons are re-accelerated by turbulence and ICM shocks or by new supernovae, since massive stars can be found in H II regions that are located in its ram pressure stripped tail.

According to studies, extended ionized gas can be found surrounding IC 4040. This shows increased radial velocities which reaches up between 400 and 800 kilometer per seconds within distance from the nucleus of the galaxy. Not to mention, a low velocity filament is found at the southeastern edge of IC 4040 which exhibits blue continuum and strong Hα emission. The widths exceeds 200 Å and much more compared to 1000 Å for some knots, indicating the intensive activity of star formation. Some of these filaments show signs of shock emission-line spectra suggesting shock heating plays an important function in excitation and ionization of extended ionized gas. IC 4040 also presents a strong radio source compared to galaxies of type E/SO.

== Supernovae ==
Two supernovae have been discovered in IC 4040 so far: PTF11gdh in 2011 and SN 2022jo in 2022.

=== PTF11gdh ===
PTF11gdh was discovered on June 21, 2011, in IC 4040 by Palomar Transient Factory. The supernova was located 0" east and 0" south of the nucleus. The supernova was Type la.

=== SN 2022jo ===
SN 2022jo was discovered in IC 4040 on January 9, 2022, by a group of astronomers; Chunpeng Bi, Jianlin Xu, Mi Zhang, Jingyuan Zhao, Guoyou Sun, Jiangao Ruan and Wenjie Zhou from Xingming Observatory. SN 2022jo was found at Right Ascension (13hr 00min 37s .666) and Declination (+28 degrees 0.3' 25".71). It was located 0".0 east and 0".0 north of the nucleus. The supernova was Type II.
