= 5C 07.106 =

Radio galaxy in the constellation Cancer

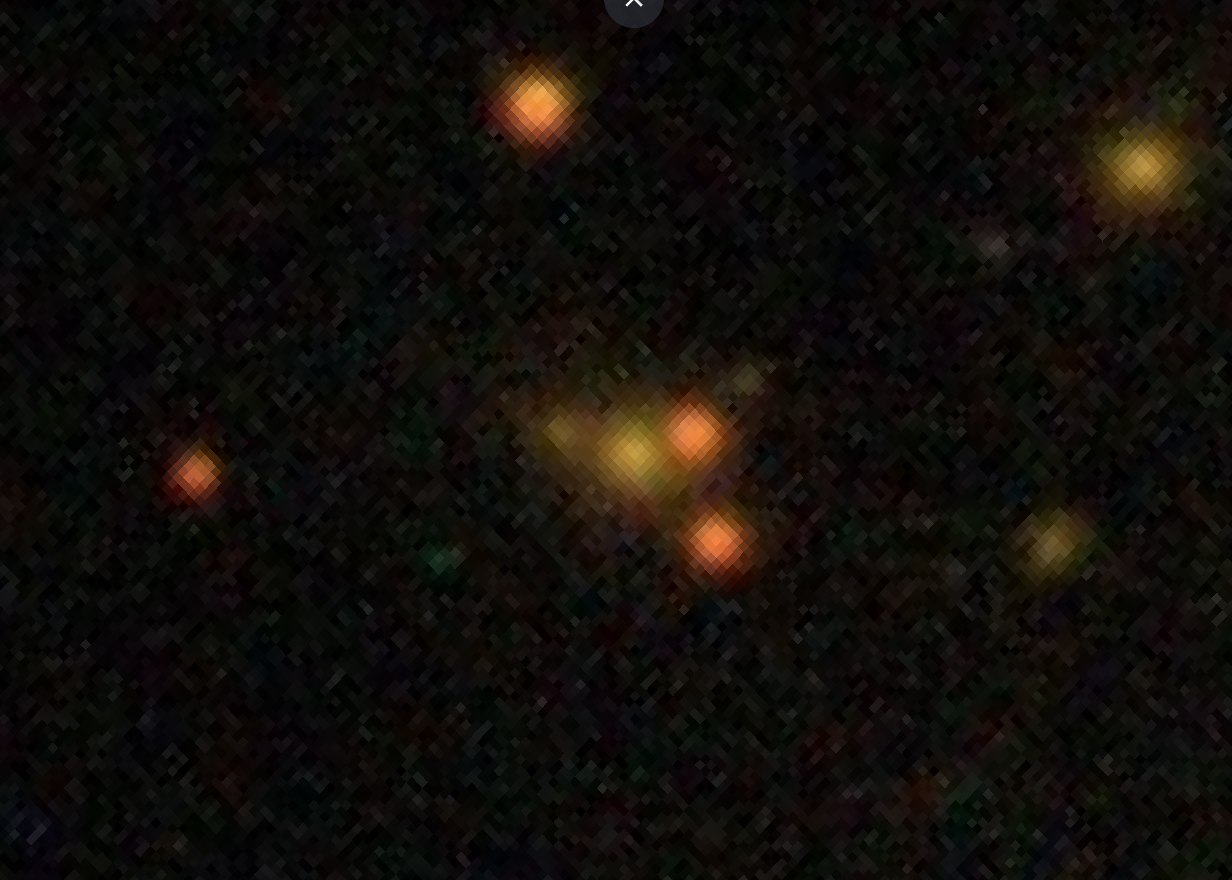
- SDSS image of 5C 07.106

Observation data (J2000.0 epoch)
- Constellation: Cancer
- Right ascension: 08^{h} 18^{m} 52.25^{s}
- Declination: 26° 23′ 55.06″
- Redshift: 0.264000
- Heliocentric radial velocity: 79,145 ± 600 km/s
- Distance: 3,804.4 ± 269.4 Mly (1,166.43 ± 82.60 Mpc)
- magnitude (H): 14.34

Characteristics
- Type: FRI
- Size: ~629,000 ly (193.0 kpc) (estimated)

Other designations
- B2 0815+26, 2MASX J08185223+2623556, LEDA 1774705, MG2 J081850+2623, NVSS J081852+262354, TONS08 0526, TXS 0815+265

5C 07.106 also known as B2 0815+26, is a radio galaxy located in the constellation of Cancer. The redshift of the galaxy is (z) 0.264 and it was first discovered in the 5C 6 and 5C 7 survey of radio sources by astronomers in February 1978.

== Description ==
5C 07.106 is a narrow-line radio galaxy with a k-band magnitude of 15.21 ± 0.01. There are narrow doubly ionized oxygen [O III] emission lines in its optical spectrum, with estimated line luminosities of less than 33.82 L_{☉}. There are also detections of singly ionized calcium emission lines.

The galaxy is also found to host a radio source, with a total radio luminosity of 25.27 W Hz^{−1} sr^{−1} at 151 MHz. Radio observations made with the Very Large Array and Cambridge 5-kilometer telescope at high resolutions, found it is a triple source with a strong central component as well as outer components described as extended. The radio spectrum has a spectral slope of around 0.95, between the frequencies of 0.4 and 2.7 GHz.

A study published in 2008, found it is a Fanaroff-Riley Class Type I radio galaxy, with the total linear size of the source being estimated as 104.8 kiloparsecs. In 2013, it was classified as having an X-shaped morphology, thus classifying it as an X-shaped radio galaxy. The radio lobes are resolved, and they reach a distance of 65.10 kiloparsecs in total, while the angular size of the source is 32 arcseconds. The central supermassive black hole lying in the center of the galaxy is found to be 8.60 M_{☉}.
