= 5 Cs =

5 Cs or 5Cs may refer to:

- Five Cs of Singapore, meaning "Cash, Car, Credit card, Condominium and Country club membership", a phrase used in Singapore to refer to materialism
- The 5Cs, the foundation of the early economy of Phoenix, Arizona, USA.
- The five undergraduate members (5Cs) of the Claremont Colleges (7Cs), an academic consortium in Claremont, California

== See also ==
- VCS (disambiguation)
- 5C (disambiguation) for the singular of 5Cs
