= 5C 7.170 =

Radio galaxy in the constellation of Cancer

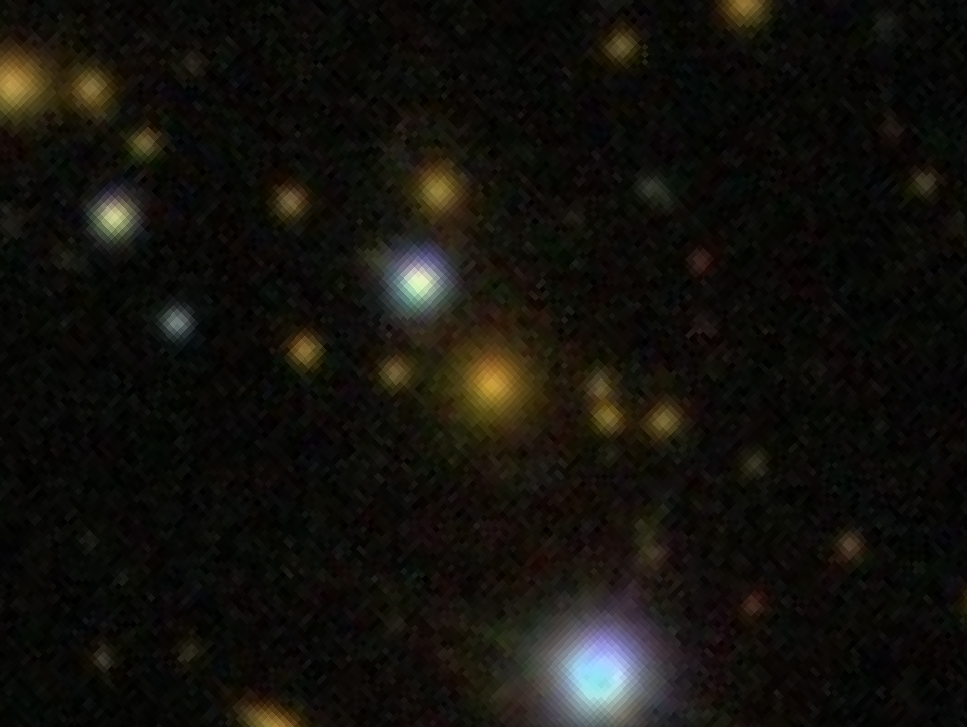
- SDSS image of 5C 5.170

Observation data (J2000.0 epoch)
- Constellation: Cancer
- Right ascension: 08^{h} 21^{m} 21.26^{s}
- Declination: +25° 19′ 03.11″
- Redshift: 0.267570
- Heliocentric radial velocity: 80,216 ± 16 km/s
- Distance: 3,869.7 ± 270.9 Mly (1,186.45 ± 83.05 Mpc)
- Group or cluster: WHL J082121.3+251903
- magnitude (J): 15.92

Characteristics
- Type: BrClG
- Size: ~356,000 ly (109.0 kpc) (estimated)

Other designations
- 2MASX J08212126+2519038, B2 0818+25, [BFS2025] J0821+2519, NVSS J082121+251903, RGZ J082121.2+251903, TONS08 0669, SDSS J082121.27+251903.0, WHL J082121.3+251903 BCG, LEDA 3523322

5C 7.170 also known as NYU-VAGC 1039773, is a radio galaxy located in the constellation of Cancer. The redshift of the galaxy is (z) 0.267 and it was first discovered as an astronomical radio source by astronomers with the Bologna Northern Cross Telescope in 1972 and designated as B2 0818+25.

== Description ==
5C 7.170 is a narrow-line radio galaxy residing as the brightest cluster galaxy (BCG) of the WHL J082121.3+251903 galaxy cluster with 52 confirmed galaxy member candidates. The K-band magnitude of the galaxy is estimated to be 14.33 ± 0.01 while the R-band magnitude is 17.84. There is presence of narrow doubly ionized oxygen emission lines in its optical spectrum with line luminosities less than 33.68 L_{ʘ}. The spectrum also has singly ionized calcium and neutral magnesium emission lines.

The central nucleus is categorized to be active and it is a Fanaroff-Riley Type II radio galaxy with a non-bend tail source whose total flux density is 127.90 mJy at 1.4 GHz frequencies by NRAO VLA Sky Survey (NVSS). The total linear size of the source is estimated to be 97.1 kiloparsecs in extent with the logarithm radio luminosity of 25.19 WHz^{−1} sr^{−1}. The largest angular size of the radio structure is 45 arcseconds whereas the deprojected length is 184 kiloparsecs. There is a presence of a radio jet with its jet inclination angle being 90°. The volume of the radio lobes is 2.49 Vℓ × 10^{63} m^{3} while the spectral index is 0.892α. Evidence found the source is mainly bent, with its bending angle measured to be 11.4° while the excess bending angle is 14.2°.

A study found the stellar velocity dispersion of the galaxy is 280 kilometers per seconds. The effective radius of the galaxy is found to be 20.4 kiloparsecs. In May 2025, it was classified as an X-shaped radio galaxy with its total radio power estimated as 2.64 × 10^{26} W Hz^{−1} and a total radio flux density of 1134.9 mJy at 144 MHz frequencies. Both the angular size and linear size of the source are 67 arcseconds and 285 kiloparsecs respectively.
