= DR Class V 180 =

Diesel locomotive series of the Deutsche Reichsbahn

DR Class V 180 DR Class 118 DB AG Class 228 (four-axle)
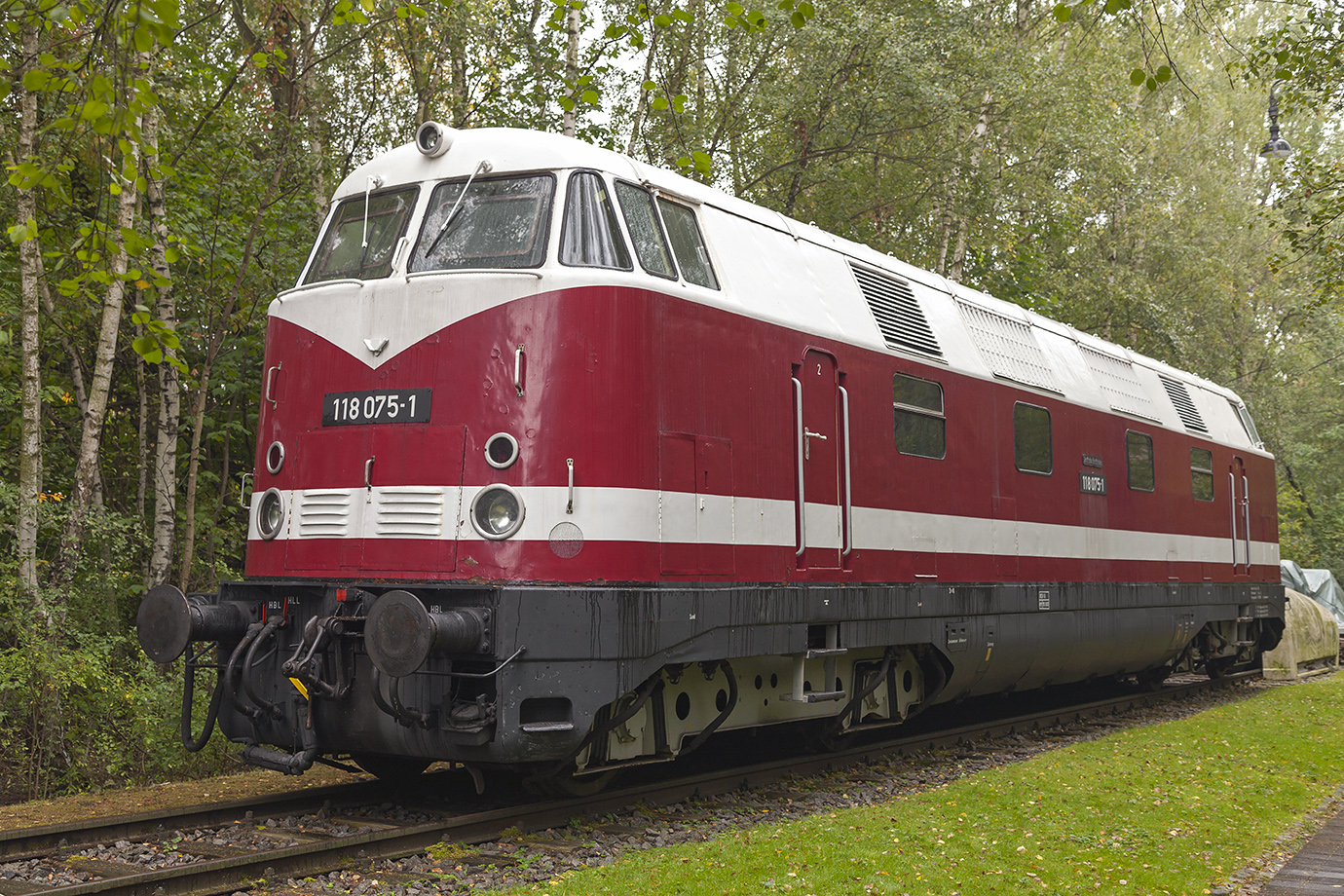
- 118 075-1
Type and origin
- Power type: Diesel-hydraulic
- Builder: Lokomotivbau Karl Marx Babelsberg
- Build date: 1960–1966
- Total produced: 169
Specifications
- Configuration
  - UIC: B′B′
  - Commonwealth: B-B
- Gauge: 1,435 mm (4 ft 8 1/2 in)
- Wheel diameter: 1,000 mm (3 ft 3 3/8 in)
- Pivot centres: 12,200 mm (40 ft 3/8 in)
- Length
  - Over buffers: 19,460 mm (63 ft 10 1/8 in)
- Width: 3,020 mm (9 ft 10 7/8 in)
- Height: 4,282 mm (14 ft 5/8 in)
- Axle load: 19.5–19.8 t (19.2–19.5 long tons; 21.5–21.8 short tons)
- Service weight: 78.0–79.3 t (76.8–78.0 long tons; 86.0–87.4 short tons)
- Prime mover: 12 KVD 18/21 (×2)
- Engine type: V12 four-stroke diesel (×2)
- Aspiration: Turbocharged
- Transmission: Hydraulic transmission
- Train heating: Köthen train heating boiler
Performance figures
- Maximum speed: 120 km/h (75 mph)
- Power output: 900 or 1,000 PS (662 or 735 kW; 888 or 986 hp) (×2)
- Factor of adh.
  - Starting: 228 or 255 kN (51,000 or 57,000 lbf)
Career
- Numbers: V 180 001 – V 180 087; V 180 101 – V 180 182; 118 503 … 118 587
- Retired: by 1995 (DB AG)

DR Class V 180 DR Class 118 DBAG Class 228 (six-axle)
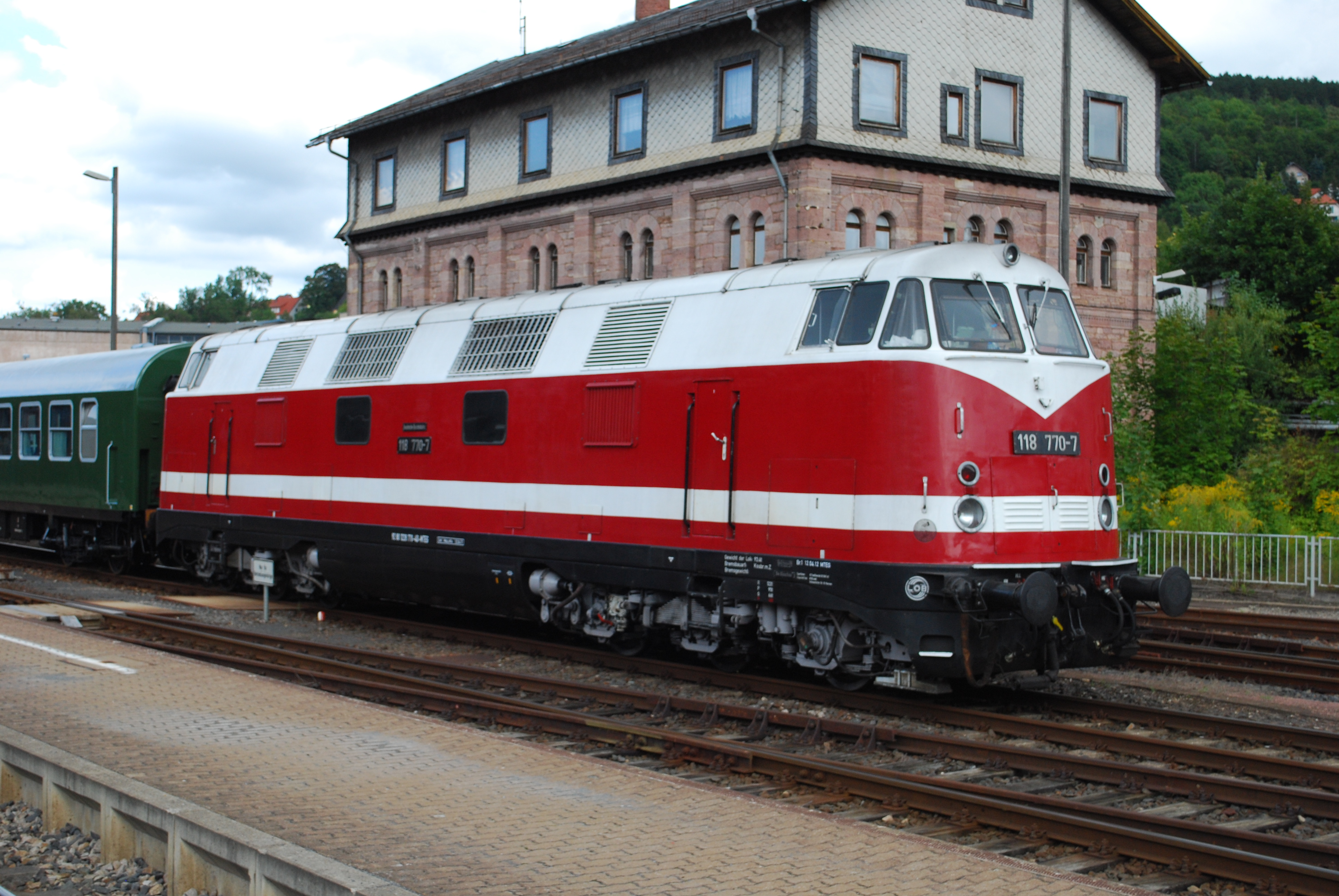
- 118 770 at the Meiningen Steam Festival, September 2012
Type and origin
- Build date: 1966–1970
- Total produced: 206
Specifications
- Configuration
  - UIC: C′C′
  - Commonwealth: B-B
- Wheel diameter: 1,050 mm (3 ft 5 3/8 in)
- Pivot centres: 10,910 mm (35 ft 9 1/2 in)
- Axle load: 15.5–15.6 t (15.3–15.4 long tons; 17.1–17.2 short tons)
- Service weight: 93.6–95.0 t (92.1–93.5 long tons; 103.2–104.7 short tons)
Performance figures
- Power output: 900 or 1,000 or 1,200 PS (662 or 735 or 883 kW; 888 or 986 or 1,180 hp) (×2)
- Tractive effort
  - Starting: 230 or 270 kN (52,000 or 61,000 lbf)
Career
- Numbers: V 180 201 – V 180 399; 118 201 – 180 406; 118 601 … 118 806
- Only differences with four-axle version are shown

The DR Class V 180 of Deutsche Reichsbahn (from 1970 Class 118, later DBAG Class 228) was a class of the largest diesel locomotives built in the German Democratic Republic. The manufacturer was Lokomotivbau Karl Marx Babelsberg (LKM).

The V 180 was intended to accelerate the change of traction on the Deutsche Reichsbahn and therefore replace various steam locomotive classes in use on the main lines.

== History ==
In 1953 the Deutsche Reichsbahn commissioned the Vereinigung Volkseigener Betriebe des Lokomotiv- und Waggonbaus (Association of Nationally Owned Enterprises of Locomotive and Wagon Building, LOWA) with the development of modern diesel rolling stock.

After the first drafts has been submitted in 1956, a concept was presented in 1957 that provided for the heavy passenger and freight train service on the mainlines to be powered by locomotives with engines of 1,800 to 2,000 PS (1,320 to 1,470 kW; 1,780 to 1,970 hp).

=== Prototypes ===
In 1959, LKM completed the two prototypes locomotives V 180 001 and V 180 002 with the B′B′ wheel arrangement. Since the East German industry was not yet able to produce all the components for a large diesel locomotive that it has developed itself, the locomotives had a Voith transmission and were delivered without a train heating boiler. They had multiple working controls from Brown, Boveri & Cie. These two locomotives were not taken over by the DR, and were scrapped at the Babelsberg plant in 1965 and 1966. They were inter alia too heavy.

=== V 180.0 ===
In 1961 the state planning commission approved the funds for the construction of 128 locomotives. Two more prototypes (V 180 003 and V 180 004) were built in 1962. The electrical equipment for these came from LEW in Hennigsdorf. This was followed by a small series of five locomotives, and the first series production up to V 180 087 in the years 1963–1965. The locomotives received a pair of VEB Motorenwerk Johannisthal 12 KVD 18/21 A-1 diesel engines. These V12-cylinder short-stroke four-stroke diesel engines had a displacement of approximately 74.8 L (4,560 cu in) and a nominal output of 900 PS (662 kW; 888 hp).

=== V 180.1 ===
From 1965, more powerful engines with 1,000 PS (735 kW; 986 hp) were installed. To distinguish them, these locomotives were designated as V 180.1. From 1983 three of these locomotives even received engines with 1,400 and 1,500 PS (1,030 and 1,100 kW; 1,380 and 1,480 hp) output.

=== V 180.2 ===
A version with the C′C′ wheel arrangement was developed for use on branch lines with a permissible axle load of 16 tonnes. In 1964, the V 180 201 was completed with two 900 PS (890 hp; 660 kW) engines. From 1966, after extensive testing, a total of 205 locomotives with 1,000 PS (735 kW; 986 hp) engines followed from V 180 203, the last of which were delivered under the new series designation 118. From V 180 298 onwards, an East German-made fluid transmission from VEB Turbinenfabrik Dresden could be installed.

=== 118.5 ===
From 1979 to 1987, 52 locomotives of the first series, which had been designated 118.0 since 1970, were equipped with new 12 KVD 18/21 A-3 engines of 1,000 PS (735 kW; 986 hp). In seven locomotives, the engine was even set to 1,223 PS (900 kW; 1,210 hp). The converted locomotives were re-designated as the class 118.5 from 1981.

=== 118.6 ===
From 1981 to 1989, 179 locomotives of the 118.2–4 series were equipped with 1,200 PS (883 kW; 1,180 hp) engines during scheduled investigations; they also received a fleet number increased by 400.

== Construction ==
The locomotives had a lightweight frame. It was initially built in a version with a pair of two-axle bogies. Since the power from the gearboxes located under the driver's cabs could best be transmitted to the bogies at the point where the pivot pins would be, this variant had no pivot pins. Instead, the bogies were attached to the frame using a lever system (trapezoidal strap linkage). The primary suspension was rubber compression springs with metal interlayers, the secondary suspension was leaf springs.

The locomotive had a Köthen type train heating boiler in the middle, which was also used in the DR Class V 100. The water tanks and the cooling systems for the two diesel engines, which were located behind the driver's cabs, were arranged around this. Under the high driver's cabs were placed the three-stage 120 km/h (75 mph) hydraulic transmission from the Austrian subsidiary of Voith in St. Pölten. Here also were flange-mounted the starter motors and the fan generator. The compressors driven by electric motors are also located under the driver's cabs. The control cabinets are arranged on the rear walls of the driver's cabs.

The six-axle version was equipped ex works with the further developed engines 12 KVD 18/21 A-3 with 1,000 PS (735 kW; 986 hp). When the engine was replaced at a later date, all machines were given the even more powerful version 12 KVD 18/21 AL-4 with 1,200 PS (883 kW; 1,180 hp) output. The three-axle bogies have pivot pins. The six-axle machines only had two engine room windows compared to the four of the four-axle locomotives, the outer windows had been replaced by multiple nozzle ventilation grilles.

As an experiment, highly charged engines of the type 12 KVD 18/21 AL-5, each with 1,500 PS (1,100 kW; 1,480 hp) drive power, were installed in the 1980s. Since the engines in the test phase were unreliable and the classes 132 and 119 were already equipped with correspondingly powerful locomotives, a series conversion was decided against.

From 1968 – starting with V 180 300 – hydraulic drives from VEB Strömungsmaschinen Pirna were installed.

When the locomotives passed to Deutsche Bahn AG the locomotives were reclassified as class 228.

== Types ==
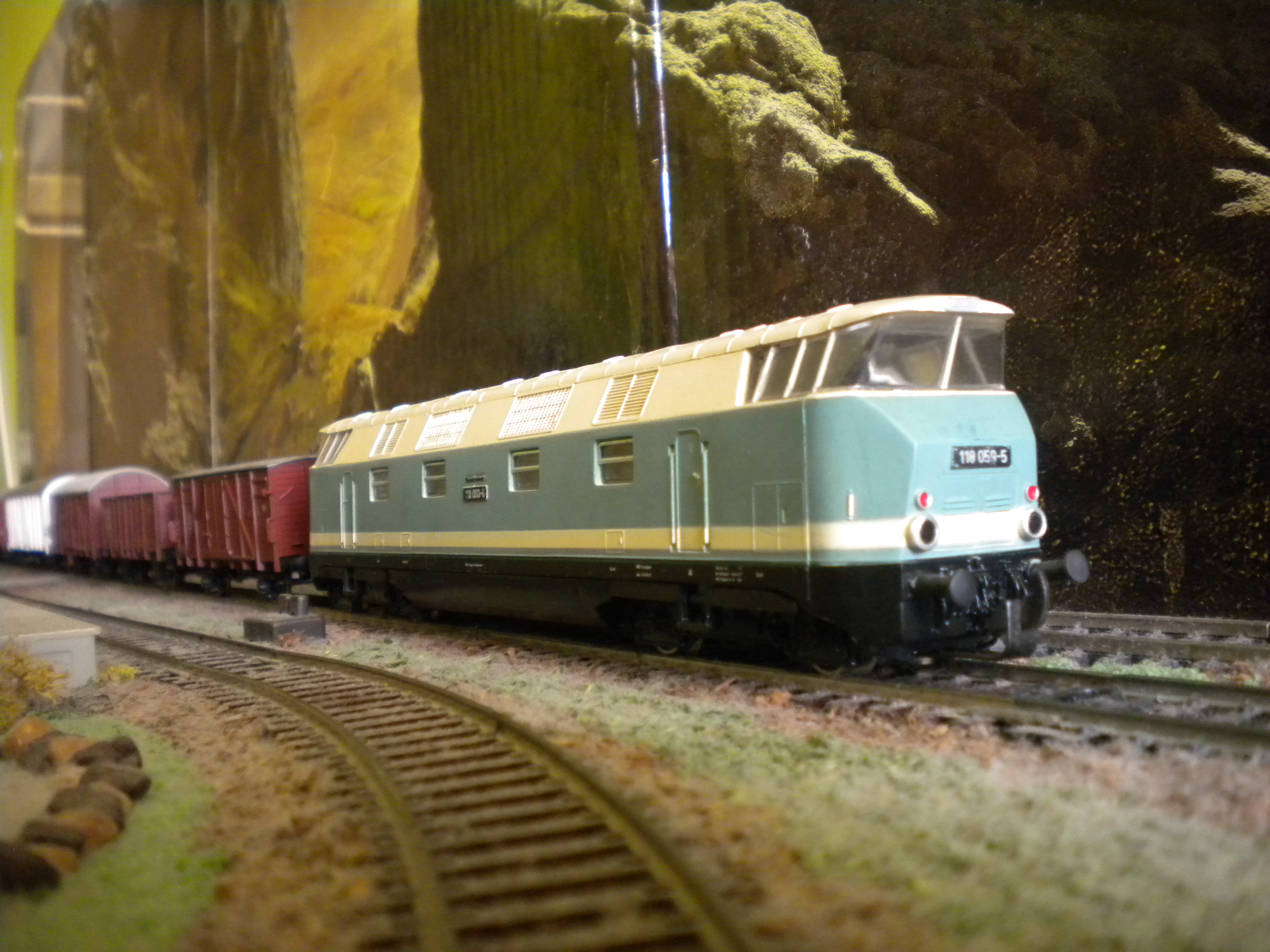
HO model of 118 059 showing the non-standard anti-glare cab.

- Prototype locomotives 001 and 002 (remained the property of the manufacturer, later scrapped)
- Pre-series: 003 and 004 (later adapted to the series version)
- Small series: 005 to 009
- Locos 059, 131 and 203 were given a glass fibre cab with an angular design and glare-free glass to give the locomotive a "representative appearance". (203 later adapted to the standard version)
- Nine works locomotives from the manufacturer's works with different gear rations (maximum speed 100 km/h (Buna) and 85 km/h (Leuna)) and without train heating for the Leuna and Buna works.

=== Sub-series ===
- 118.0 – four-axle version, 2 × 900 PS (662 kW; 888 hp), 120 km/h (75 mph)
- 118.1 – four-axle version, 2 × 1,000 PS (735 kW; 986 hp), 120 km/h (75 mph)
- 118.2–4 – six-axle version, 2 × 1,000 PS (735 kW; 986 hp), 120 km/h (75 mph)
- 118.5 – four-axle version, converted from 118.0, 2 × 1,000 PS (735 kW; 986 hp), 120 km/h (75 mph)
- 118.6–8 – six-axle version, converted from 118.2–4, 2 × 1,200 PS (883 kW; 1,180 hp), 120 km/h (75 mph)
- 118 405 – six-axle version, 2 × 1,400 PS (1,030 kW; 1,380 hp) (engines: 2 × 12 KVD 18/21 AL-4 diesels; drive: GSR 20/5.5 (1980) / GSR 30/5.7 (1984))
- 118 625 – six-axle version, 2 × 1,400 PS (1,030 kW; 1,380 hp) (engines: 2 × 12 KVD 18/21 AL-4; drive: GSR 30/5.7)
- 118 124 – four-axle version, 2 × 1,500 PS (1,100 kW; 1,480 hp) (engines: 2 × 12 KVD AL 5; drive: modified GSR 30/5.7), 120 km/h (75 mph)
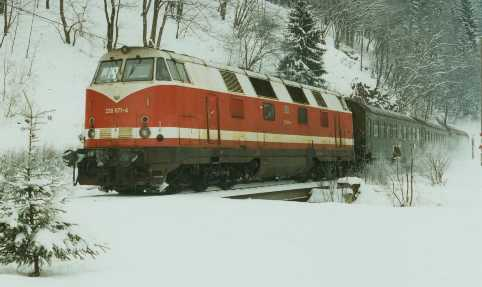
Subclass 118.2–4

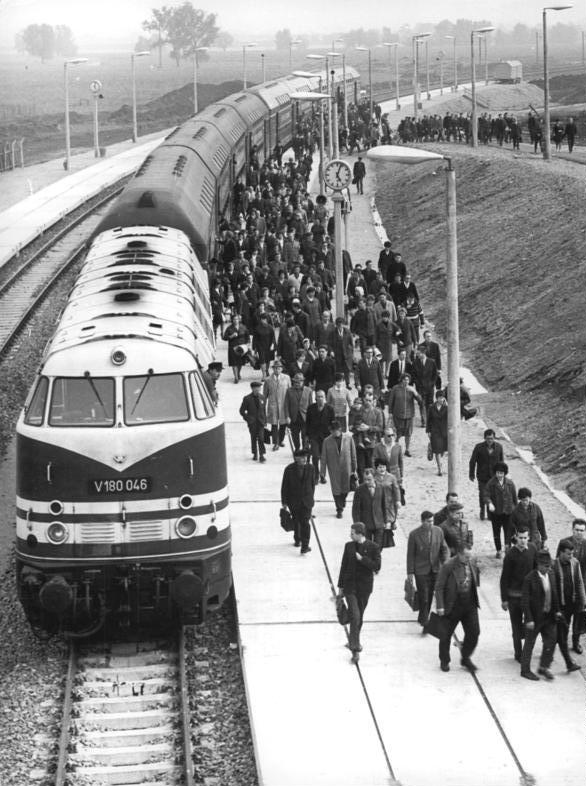
V 180 046 in Halle-Neustadt, 9 June 1967

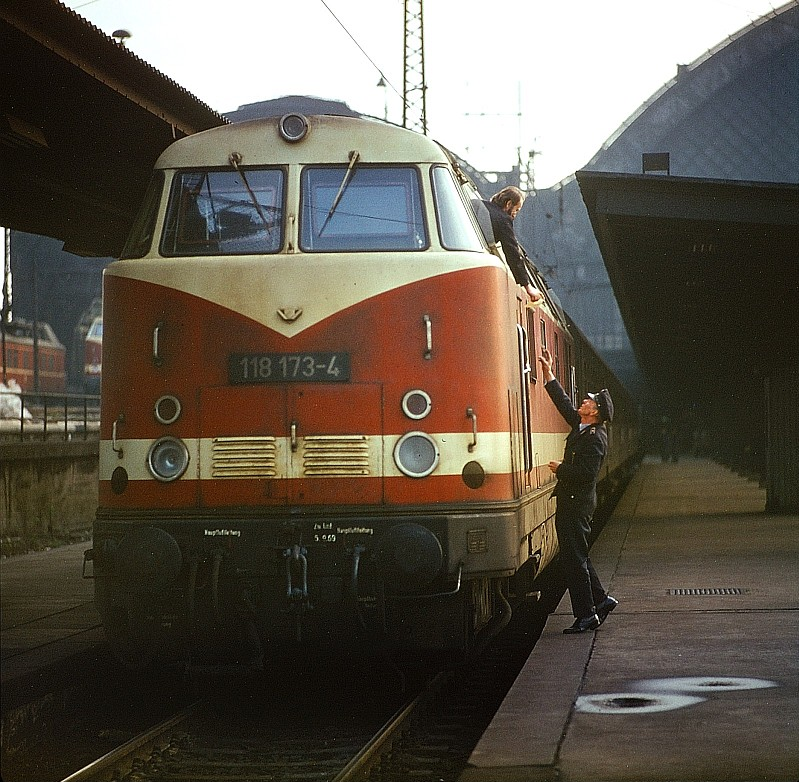
118 173-4 in Dresden Hauptbahnhof, 1972

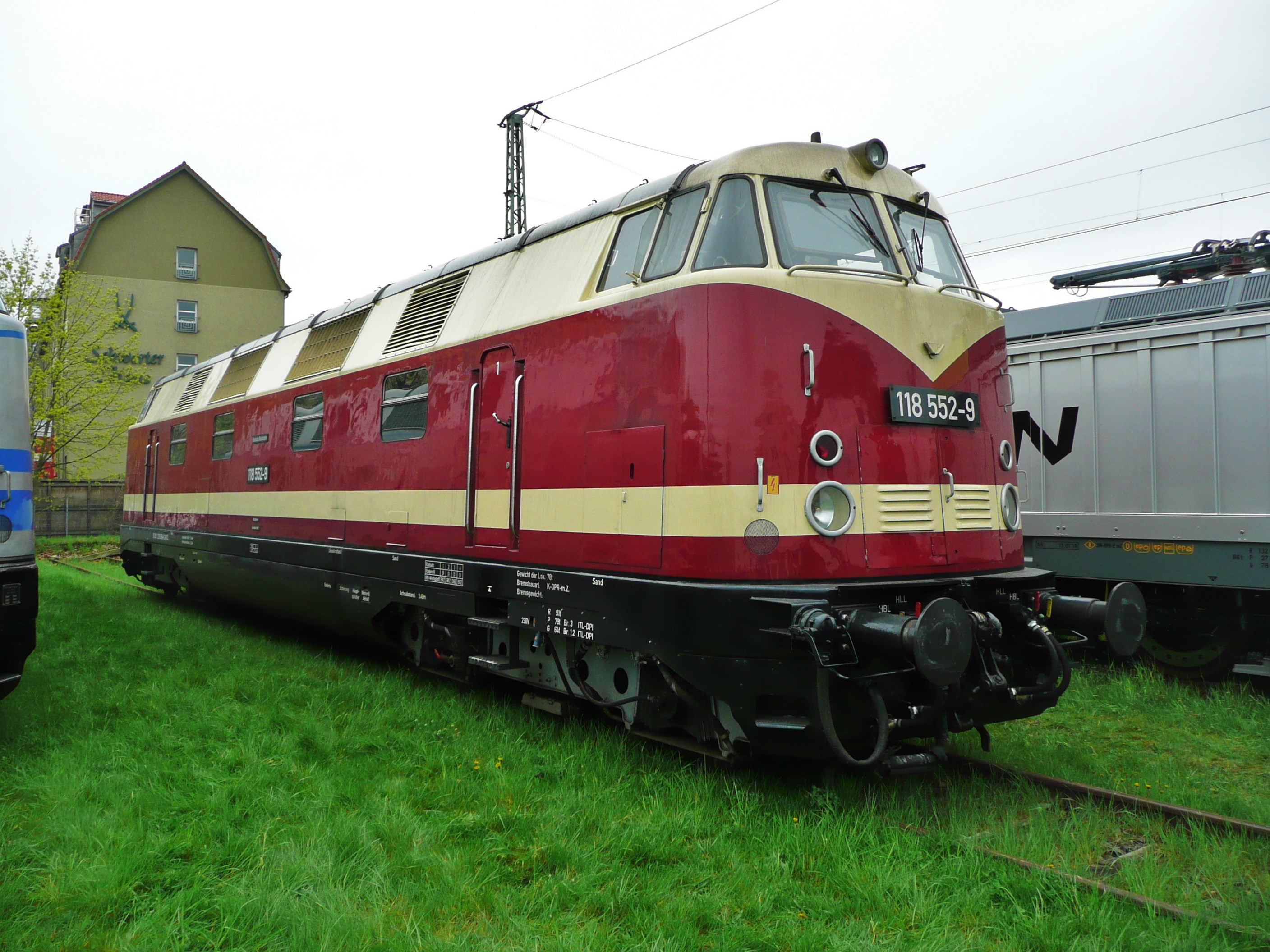
Government train locomotive 118 552 at the Dresden Steam Locomotive Festival 2016

==== V 240 001 ====
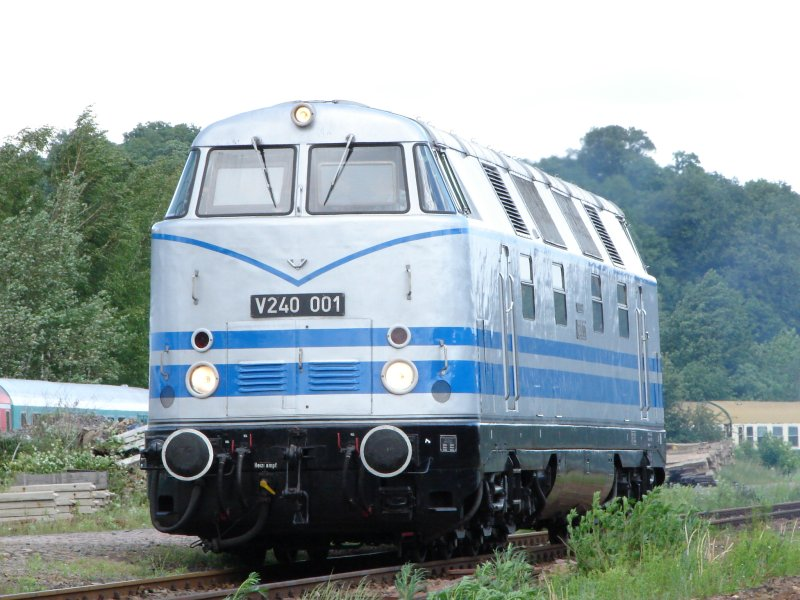
Prototype V 240 001 with 1200 PS (883 kW) engines

In 1965 the prototype of a six-axle locomotive with two 1,200 PS (883 kW; 1,180 hp) engines was presented at the Leipzig spring fair. The maximum speed of this locomotive was 140 km/h (87 mph). The superstructure corresponded to the V 180, but the driver's cabs were made of glass fibre reinforced polyester resin (GRP) and the paint was silver grey. Trials took place until 1968, despite the good tractive power, series production was not carried out. After a long period of storage, the locomotive, which had previously belonged to LKM, was acquired by the Deutsche Reichsbahn and adapted to the standard version in the Neustrelitz depot using accident locomotives; the top speed was also reduced to 120 km/h. It was then listed as 118 202.

== Service ==
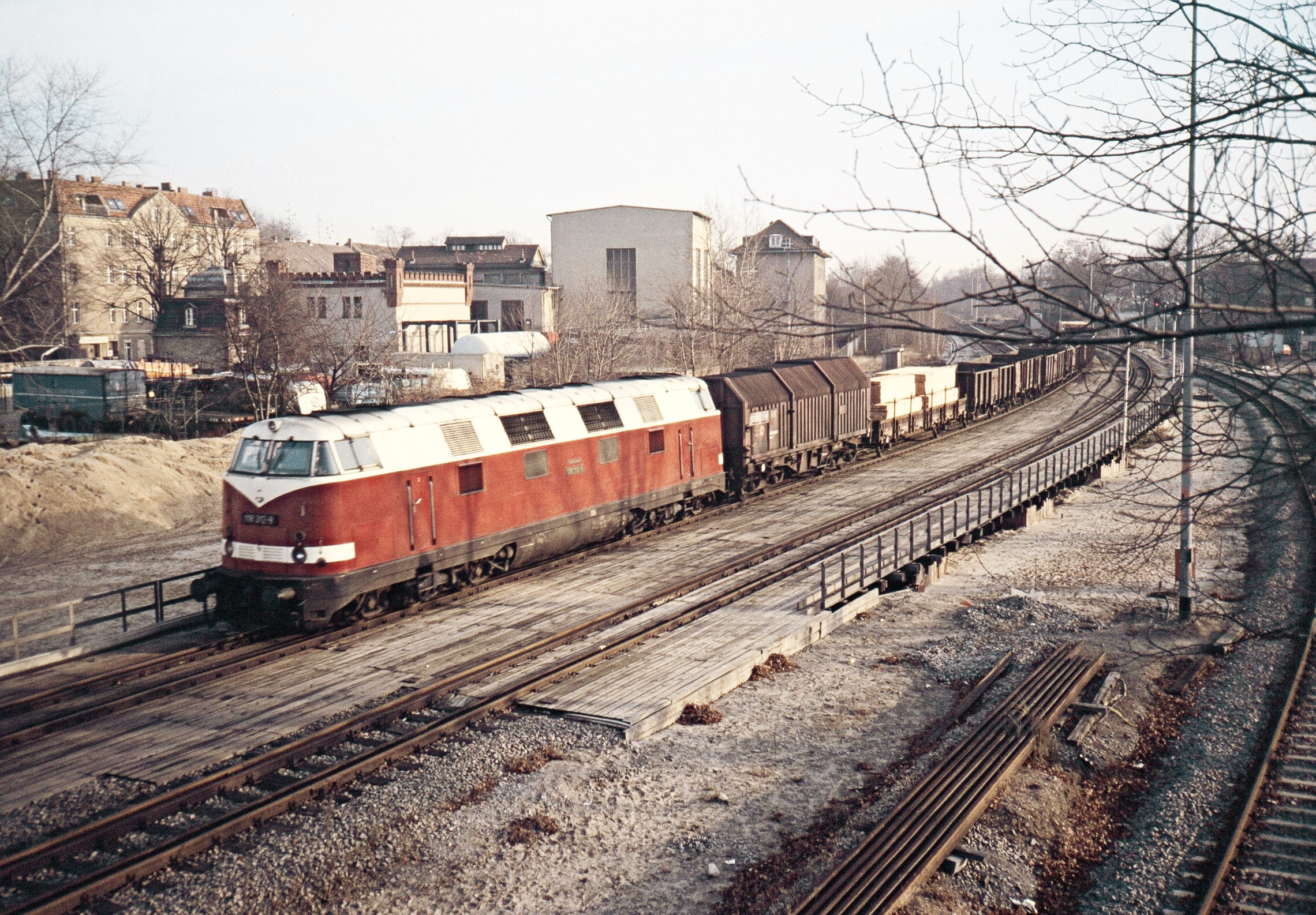
118 312 shortly before the Berlin-Tegel railway station in West Berlin on the temporary bridge over the construction site of Bundesautobahn 111, 1986

Until the delivery of the large Soviet diesel locomotives of the Class 132, the V 180 were mainly used in Schnellzugverkehr service. This also included the use in transit traffic from West Berlin in the Federal Republic. The class was regularly used in schedules for which it was not actually designed, e.g. for heavy express trains that would otherwise be hauled by steam locomotives of classes 01, 01.5, 03 and 03.10. The 118.2–4 (.6–8) subclass could be used universally as, with an axleload of 15.6 tonnes, it could be used on lightly laid branchlines. They could also be used on sections with steep grades. After the transition from older steam-heated coaches to newer electrically heated coaches, their use on passenger trains ended; similar to the 110/112 classes. In addition, traffic ceased on most of the steep stretches and the locomotives were therefore dispensable. In 1995 the last examples of the 228.2–4 were withdrawn from service by DB AG; some of the 228.6–8 were kept until 10 June 1998.

Three locomotives, the 118 548, 550 and 552, were assigned to the GDR government train. The locomotives were in operation in April 1990 between Berlin-Wannsee and Potsdam Hbf in cross-border S-Bahn advance traffic. The 118 552 is the last operational locomotives of the ITL and has been in service since 2015 as 118 552 in the old red paint scheme. 118 548 and 550 were sold in 1992; the latter was scrapped in Neumark (Saxony) in 2003. On 28 October 2000, the 118 548 was involved in a serious accident in Haspelmoor, and after being condemned as non-repairable, was later scrapped in Altenbeken.

A whole series of locomotives could be sold to private railways, where some of them continued to serve for many years. However, the age of the operating time set limits, the operating costs are higher than with single-engine locomotives and the stricter exhaust gas limits made retrofitting necessary.

As recently as 2005, some locomotives were used by Mitteldeutsche Eisenbahn (MEG, an 80% subsidiary of DB Cargo Deutschland AG) on the routes around Saalfeld/Saale and Bad Lobenstein as difficulties repeatedly appeared with other series. The last operational MEG V 180 (MEG 206) was stored in April 2015 and donated to the railway museum in Wittenberge. The other MEG locos are stored or on loan to railway associations. Some other private railways still use this robust series.

The six-axle Leuna (now InfraLeuna) 204 and 205 were sold to the ITB-Eisenbahngesellschaft. Of these, the former InfraLeuna 205 is operational. Most of them come from the DR service fleet. In 2015, nine of the 42 remaining locomotives were still operational, in 2018 there were only six.

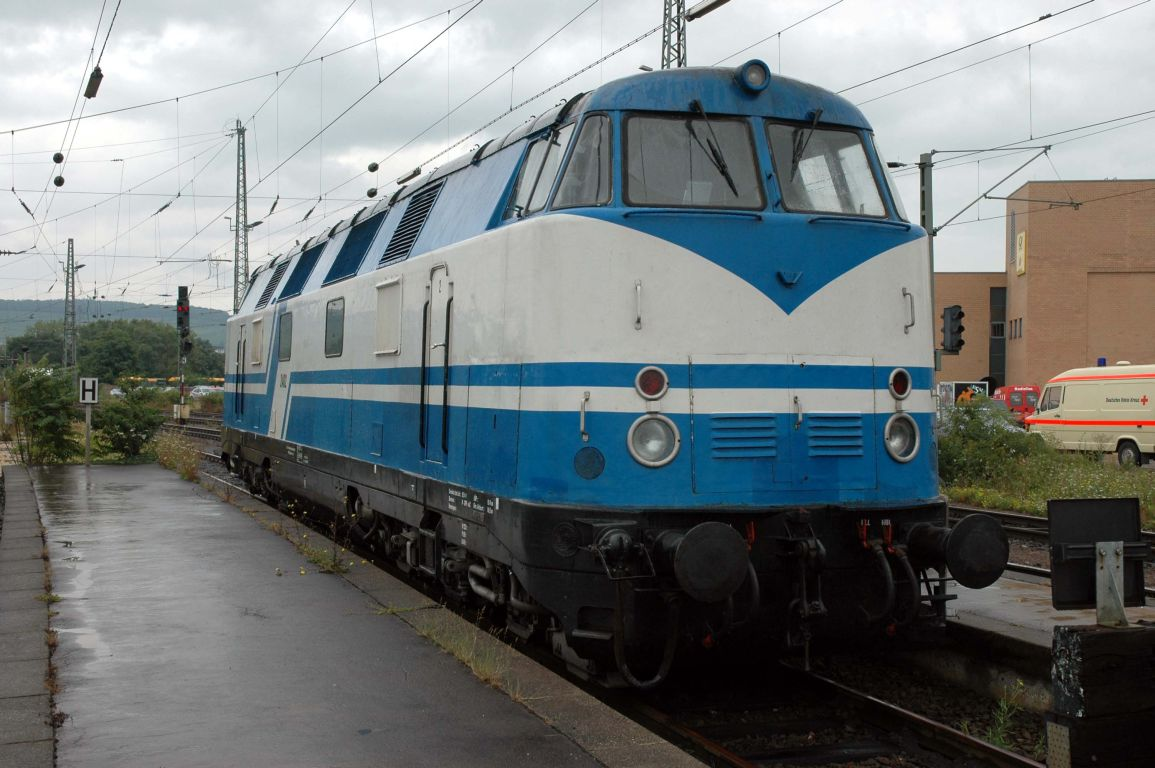
Former 228 757 in service with a private railway (August 2005)

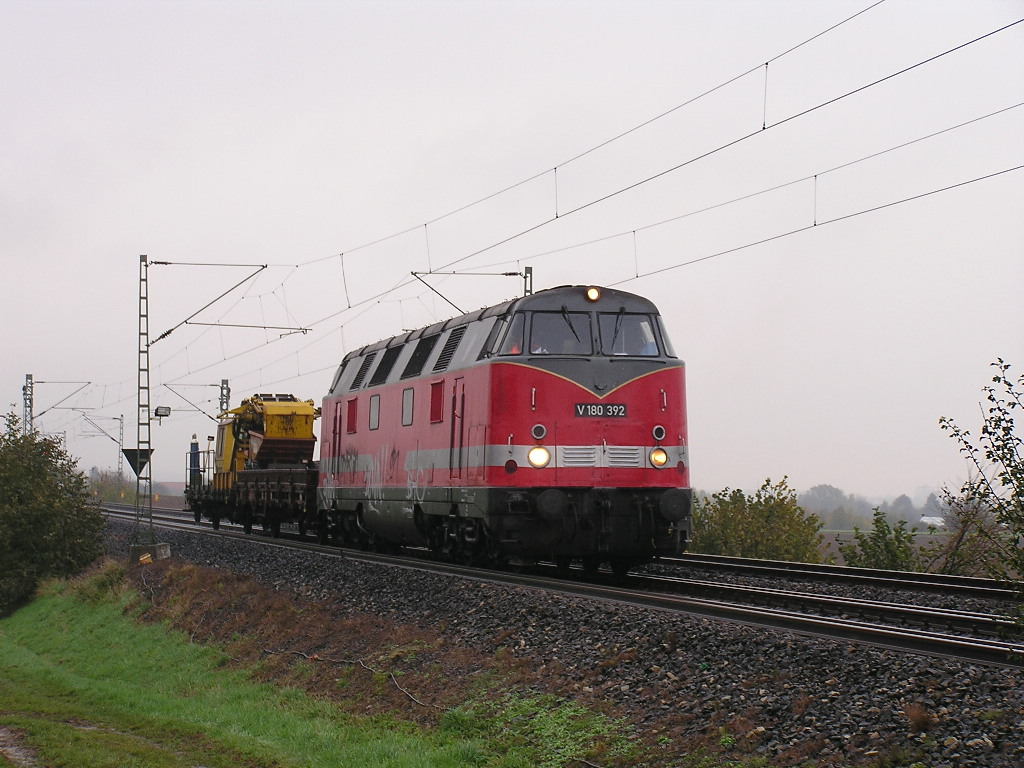
V 180 392 in permanent way service (2006)

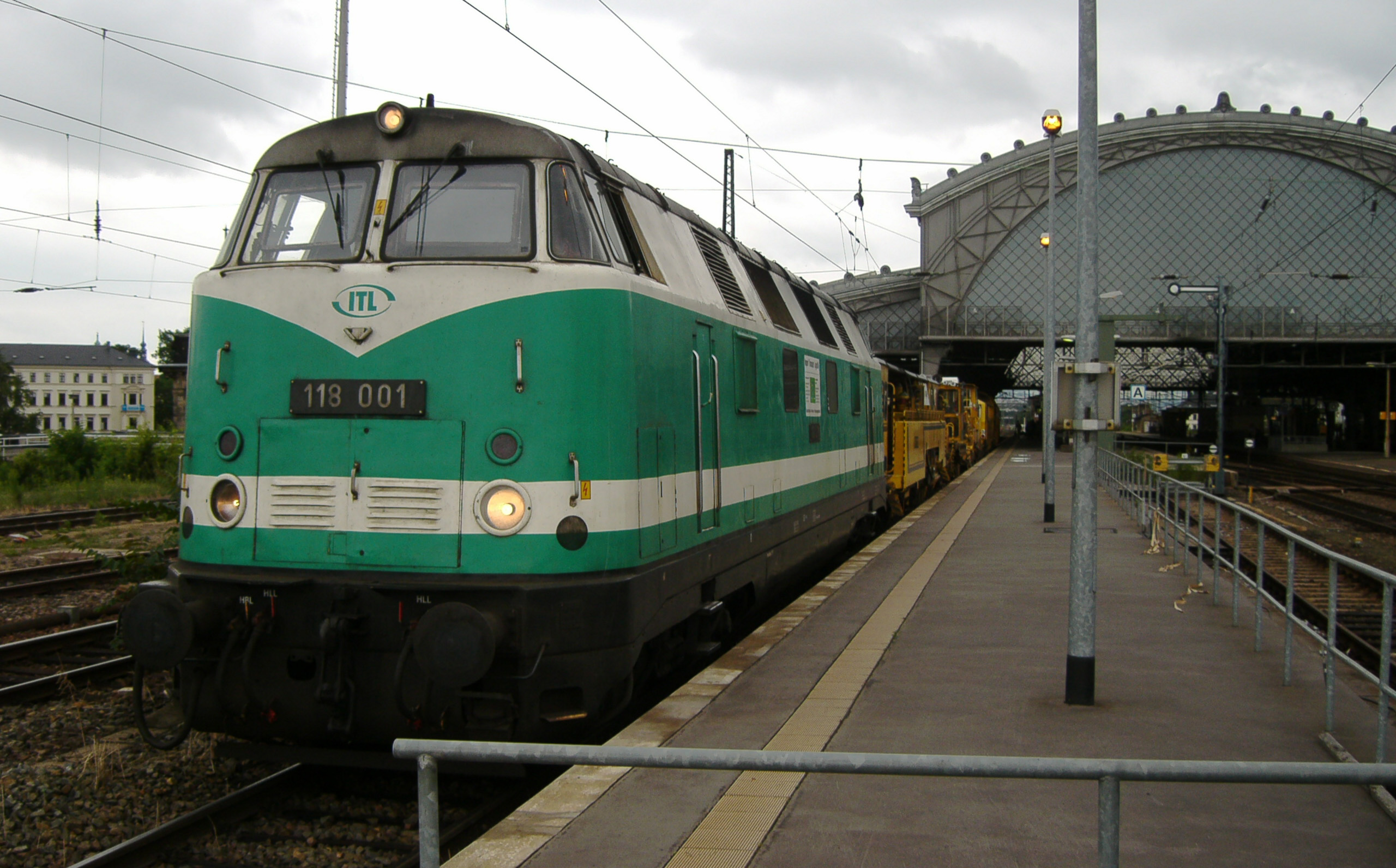
ITL 118 001 with permanent way train in Dresden-Neustadt station

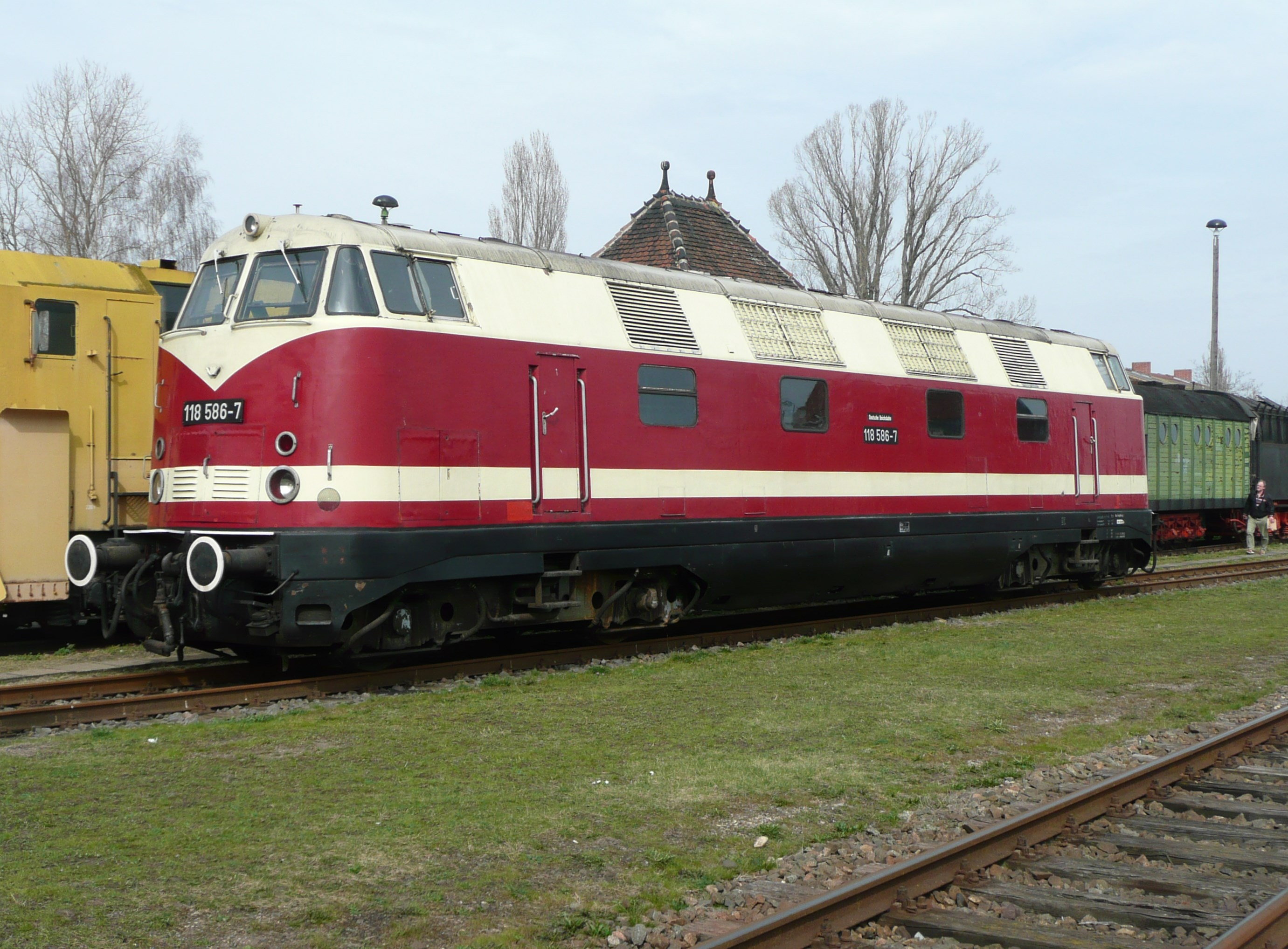
118 586 in Traditionsbetriebswerk Staßfurt

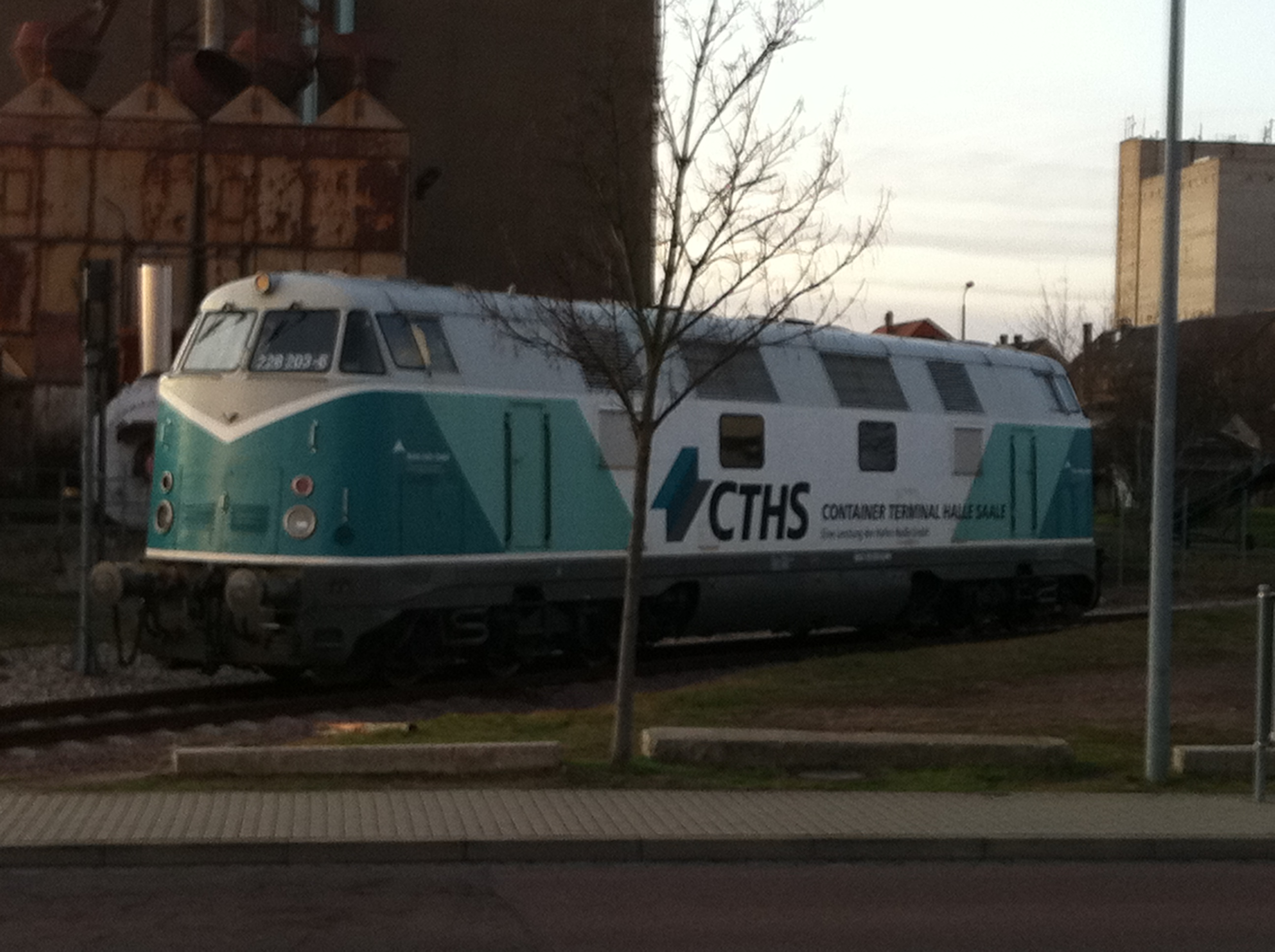
BR 228 of Container-Terminals Halle (Saale) (CTHS) on the tracks of Hafenbahn Halle-Trotha Harbour Railway

== Preserved locomotives ==
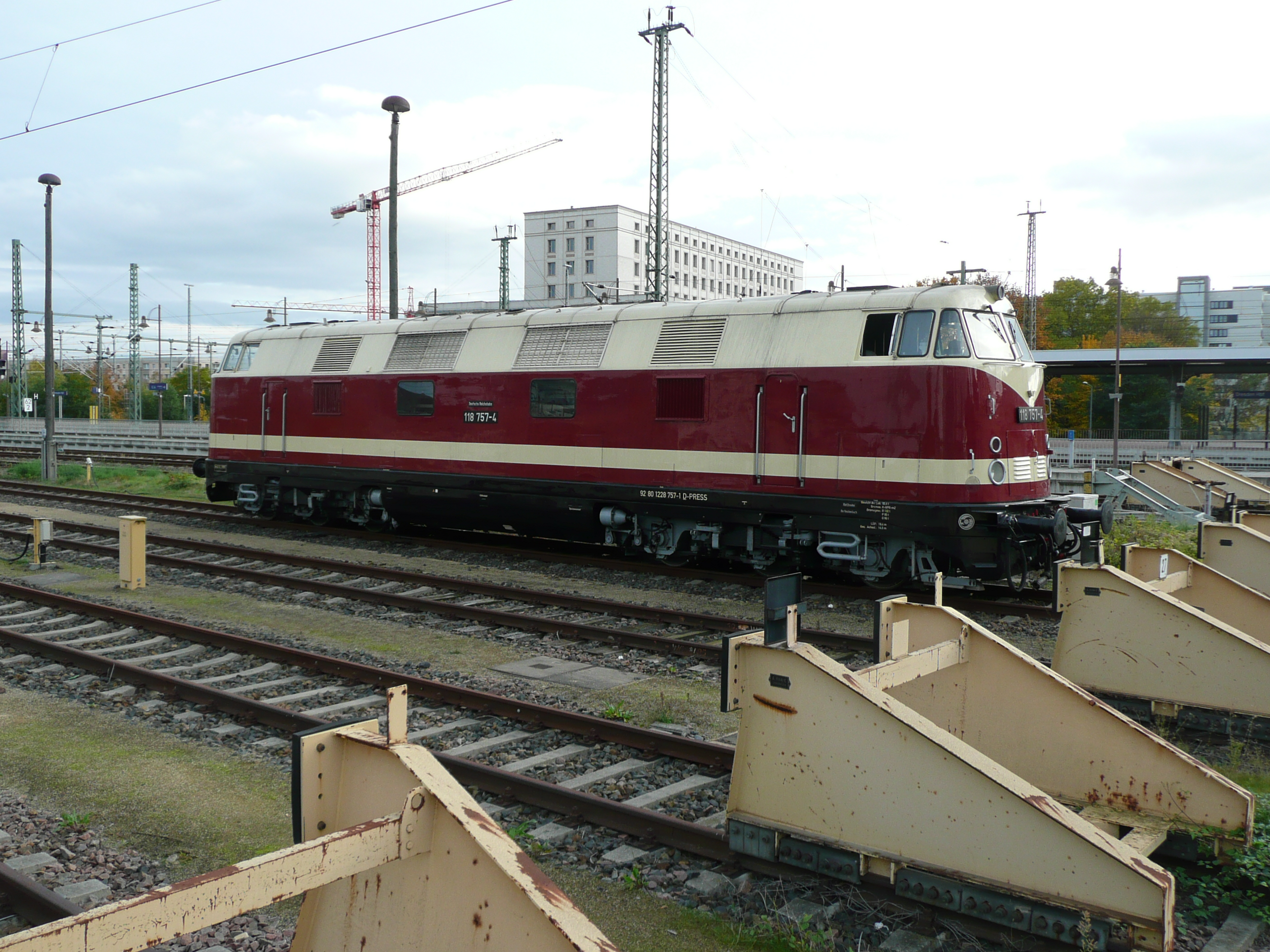
118 757 of PRESS, stored in Dresden Hbf (2020)

- 118 075: in the German Museum of Technology, Berlin, in last operating condition; largely original
- 118 118: Museum Bw Schwerin
- 118 119: Museum Bw Lutherstadt-Wittenberg, privately owned
- 118 141: Museum Bw Chemnitz-Hilbersdorf
- 118 202: as V 240 001 Dresden Transport Museum
- 118 505: was (as V 180 005) the first series loco, Museum Bw Arnstadt
- 118 578: Museum Bw Weimar
- 118 585: Plinthed at the entrance to the ITL premises in Pirna
- 118 586: Museum Bw Staßfurt
- 118 617: Tuttlingen Railway Museum
- 118 683: with the Ostsächsische Eisenbahnfreunde e. V. in Löbau (Sachs) station on loan from the DB-Museum in Nuremberg (until 2022)
- 118 692: Historic locomotive shed in Wittenberge
- 118 731: Museum Bw Weimar
- 118 757: Work locomotive for the Eisenbahn-Bau- und Betriebsgesellschaft Pressnitztalbahn
- 118 748: Historic locomotive shed in Wittenberge
- 118 749: Museum Bw Arnstadt
- 118 770: Museum Bw Glauchau
- 118 776: Museum Bw Schwarzenberg
- 118 782: Museum Bw Chemnitz-Hilbersdorf
- 118 788: Museum Bw Weimar
- 118 791: Ostsächsische Eisenbahnfreunde e.V.
- 118 802: Museum Bw Leipzig Süd / DB Museum Halle (Saale)
- BUNA 201: Museum Bw Gera
- BUNA 202: Museum Bw Staßfurt
- BUNA 203: Museum Bw Weimar
