= VCS =

VCS may refer to:

== Video games ==
- Atari VCS or Atari 2600 video game console
- Atari VCS (2021 console), microconsole
- Grand Theft Auto: Vice City Stories
- Vietnam Championship Series, of League of Legends e-sports

== Technology ==
- Veritas Cluster Server
- Version control system, for managing versions of software, etc.
- Virtual camera system
- Virtual Cluster Switching, networking technology
- VCalendar file extension

== Schools ==
- The Villages Charter Schools, Sumter County, Florida, US
- Valley Christian Schools (Dublin, California), Dublin, California, US
- Valley Christian Schools (Los Angeles County, California), US
- Volusia County Schools, school district, Florida., US
- International Christian School of Vienna, Austria; formerly Vienna Christian School
- Vermont Commons School, South Burlington, Vermont, US

== Other uses ==
- Verkehrs-Club der Schweiz, a Swiss transport association
- Verified Carbon Standard, for carbon emissions
- Con Dao Airport (IATA airport code VCS), Con Son Island, Vietnam
- The voluntary and community sector in public service and economic organisation, see voluntary sector

== See also ==
- 5Cs (disambiguation)
- VC (disambiguation) for the singular of VCs
