= Viet Cong (disambiguation) =

The Viet Cong was an armed revolutionary organization in South Vietnam. It may also refer to:

- Vietcong (video game), a 2003 tactical first-person shooter video game
- Viet Cong (band), a Canadian post-punk band now known as Preoccupations
  - Viet Cong (album), their self-titled debut album
- Tiến lên, a Vietnamese card game, sometimes known in the United States as "Viet Cong"

== See also ==
- Viet Cuong (disambiguation)
