= Central 5 =

Informal political cooperation

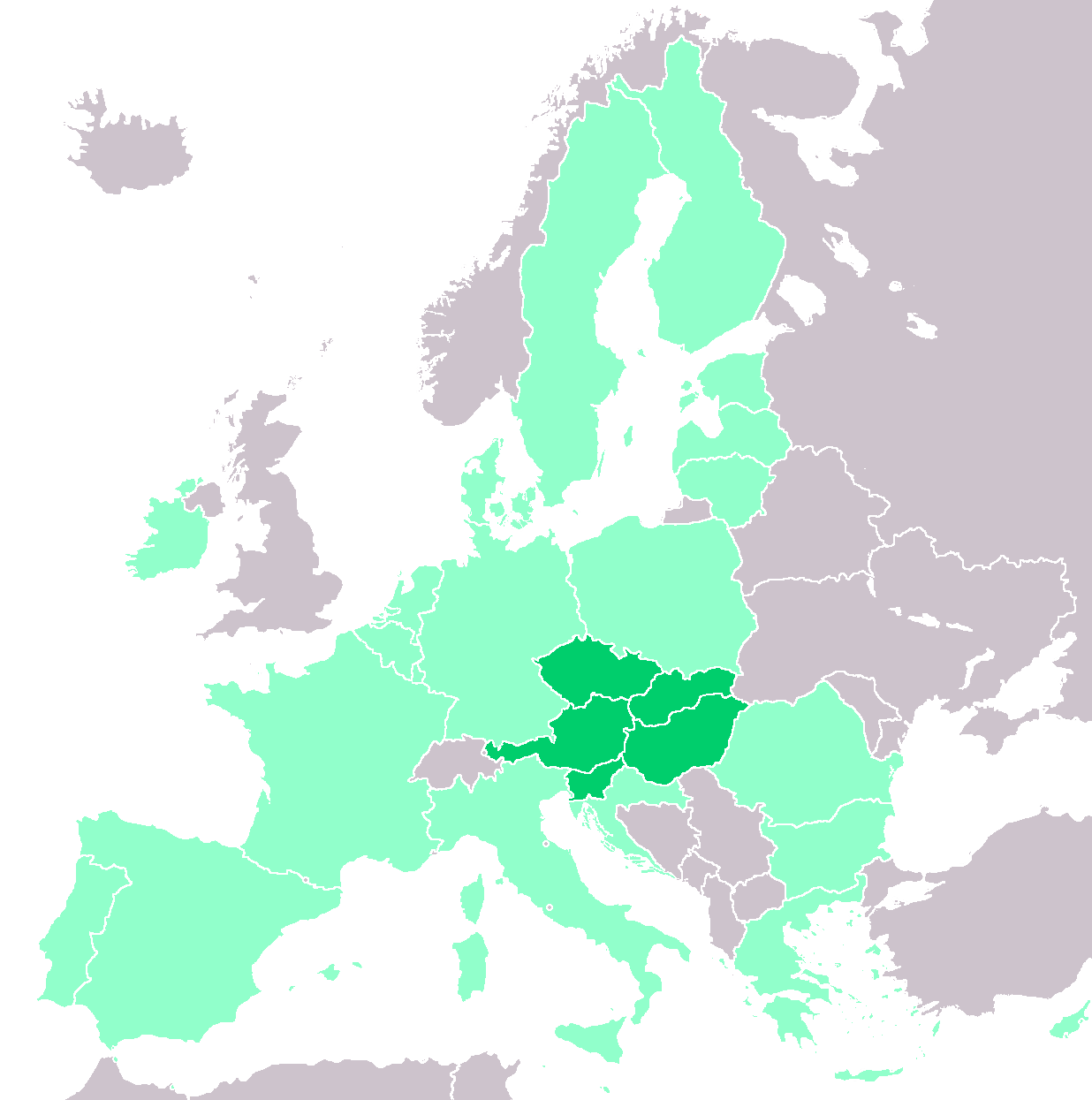
- Central 5 Group within the European Union
- Membership: Austria; Czech Republic; Hungary; Slovakia; Slovenia
- Establishment: 16 June 2020

Area
  - Total: 325,081 km^{2} (125,514 sq mi)

Population
  - 2020 estimate: 36,923,082
- GDP (nominal): 2020 estimate
  - Total: $1.088 trillion
  - Per capita: $29,461

Central 5, also Central Five (C5), is an informal Central European political cooperation between Austria, the Czech Republic, Hungary, Slovakia, and Slovenia that began in 2020. It is organised in the format of ministers responsible for foreign affairs. The group was initiated by the former Austrian Foreign Minister Alexander Schallenberg.

The main reason for closer cooperation between the countries is the coordination of the activities connected with the COVID-19 pandemic. Meetings are focused on border crossing and the exchange of views on EU activities to overcome the economic and social crisis caused by the pandemic.

== Current representatives ==
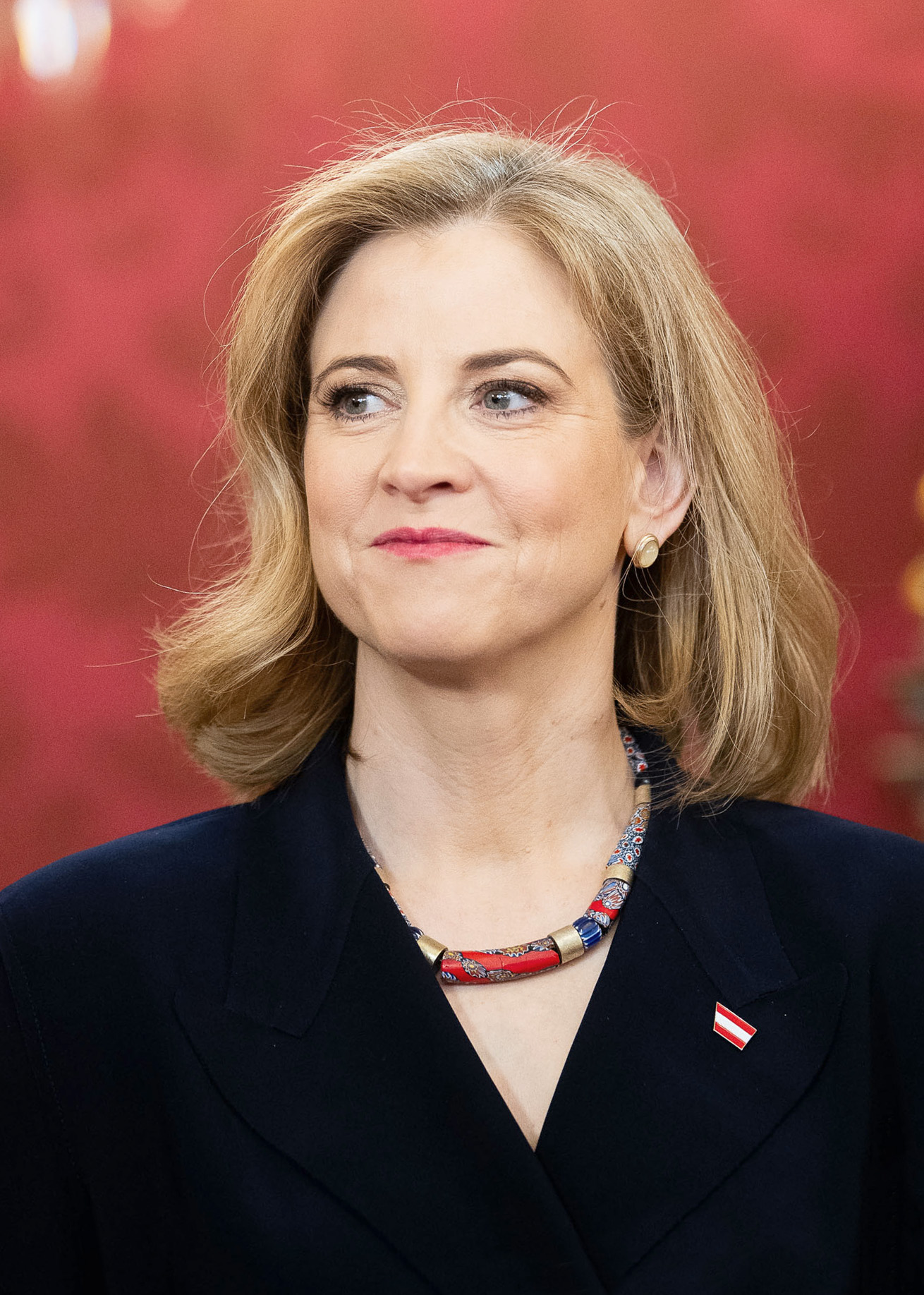
Austria Beate Meinl-Reisinger Minister of Foreign Affairs (Austria)

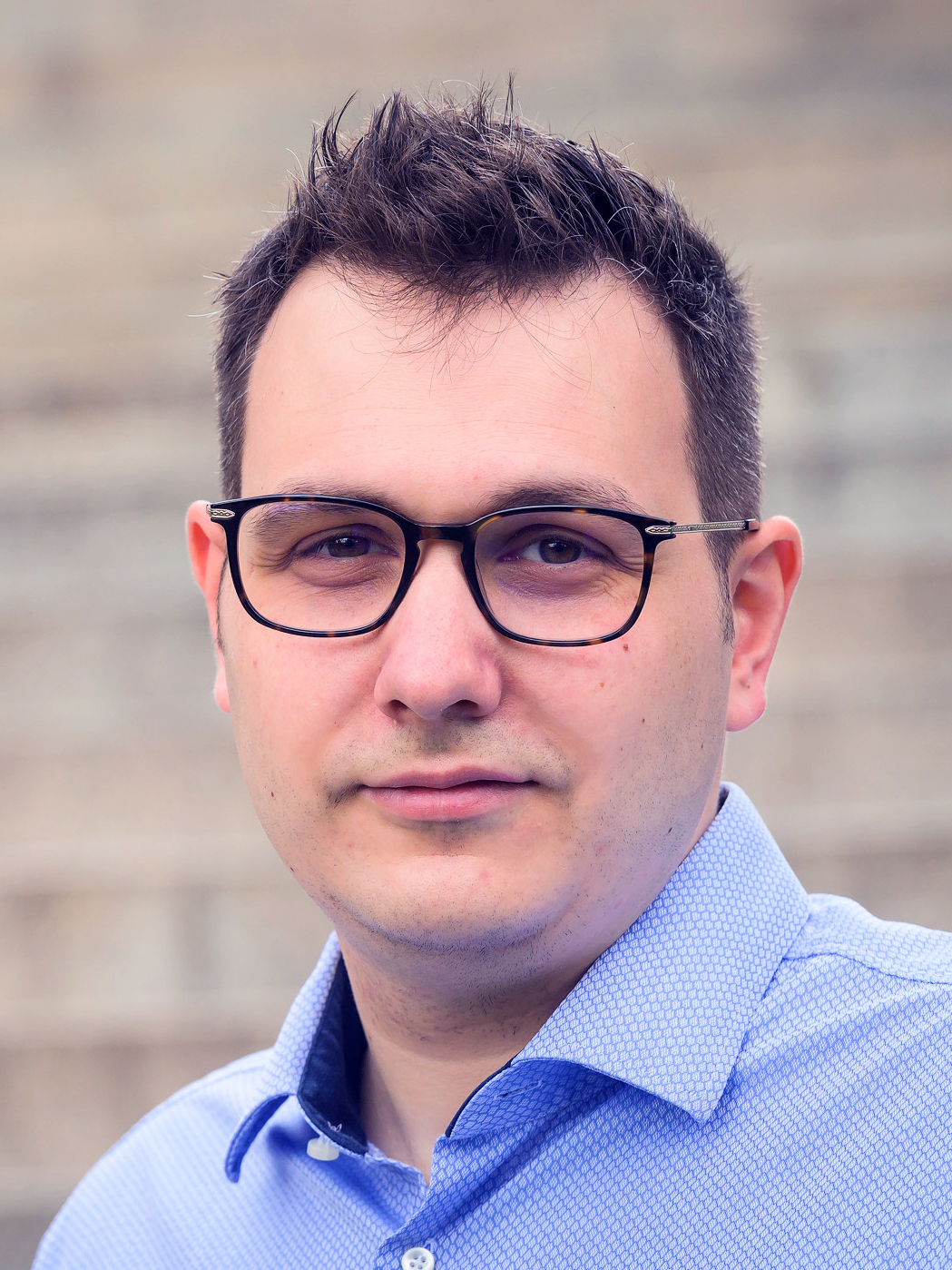
Czech Republic
Jan Lipavský
Minister of Foreign Affairs

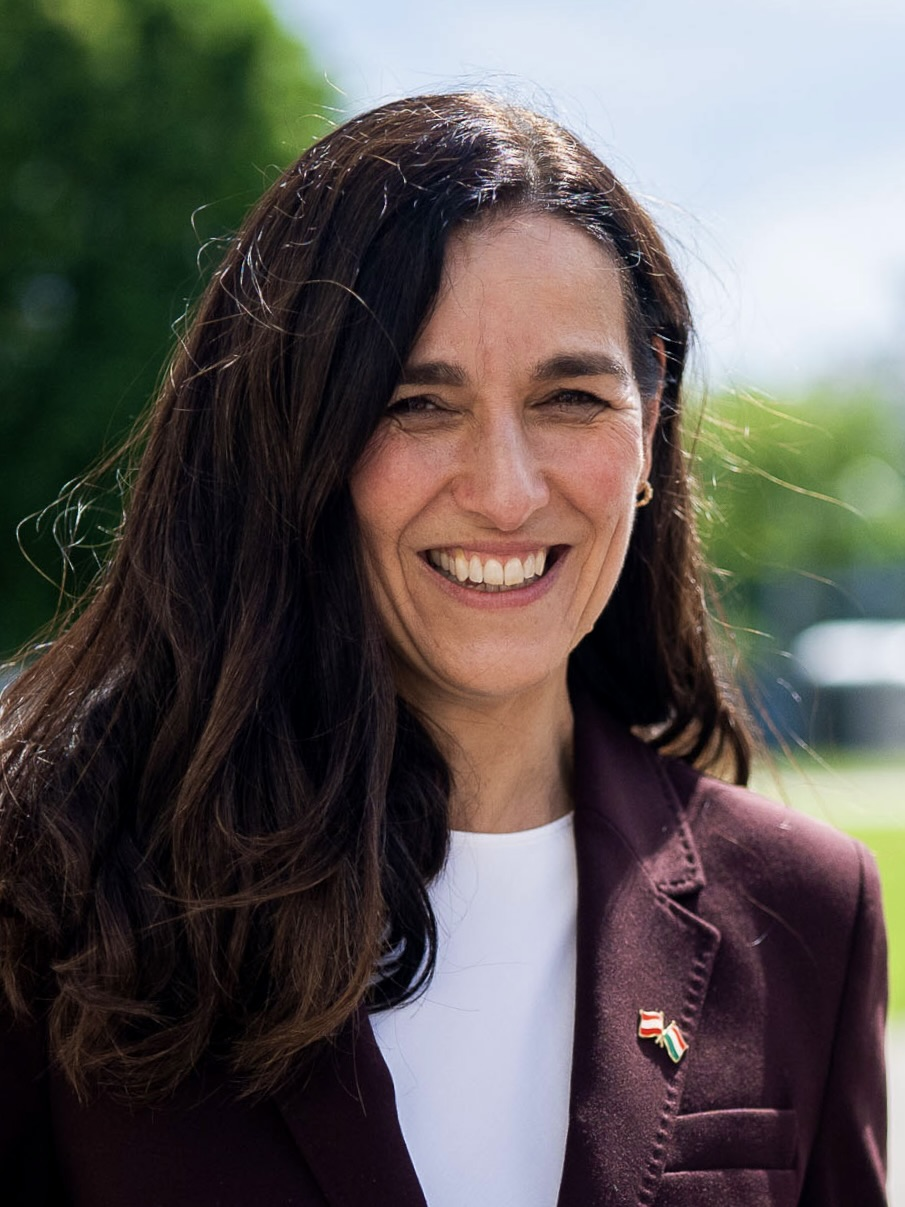
(Hungary) Hungary
Anita Orbán
Minister of Foreign Affairs

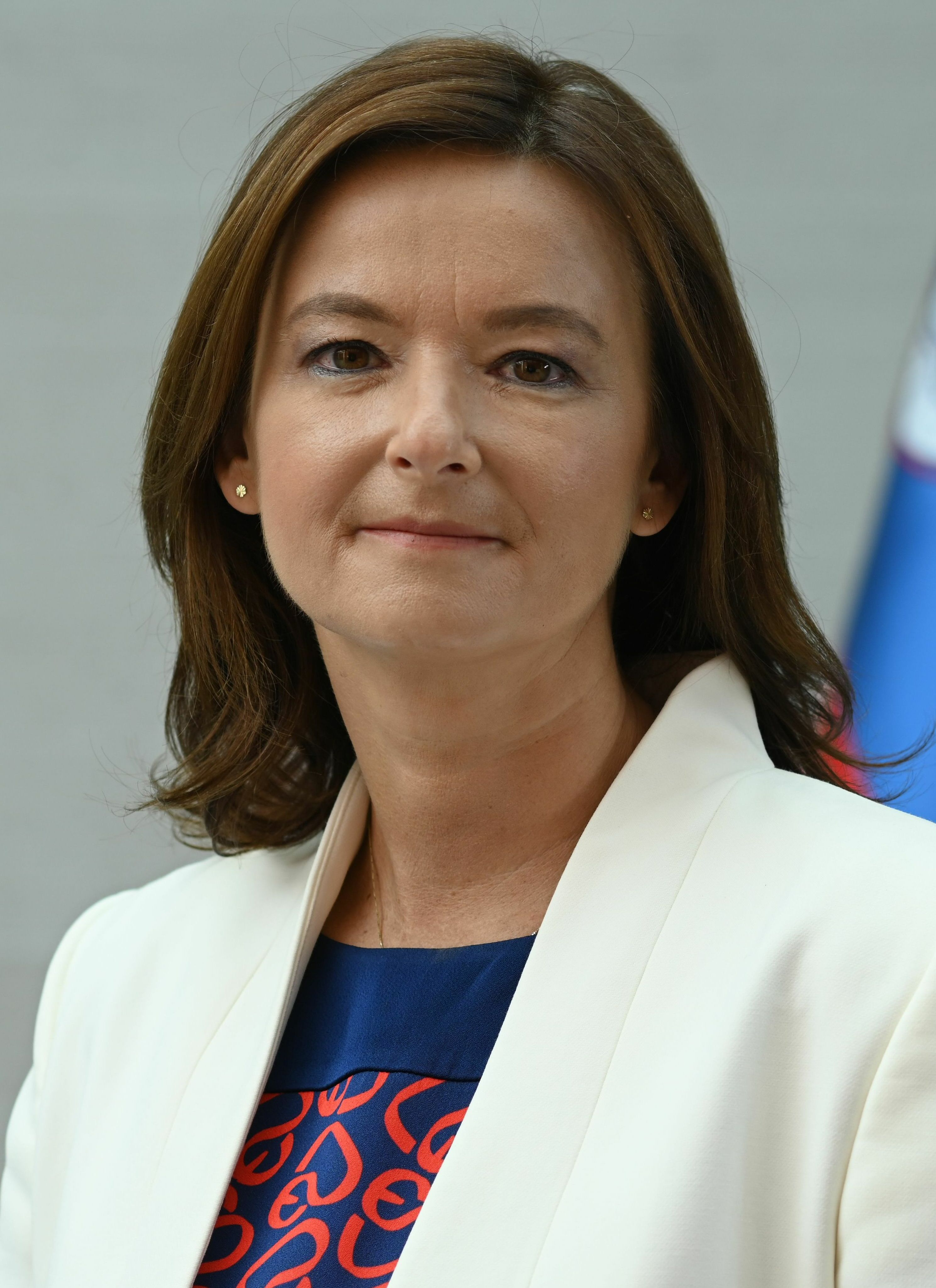
Slovenia
Tanja Fajon
Minister of Foreign and European Affairs

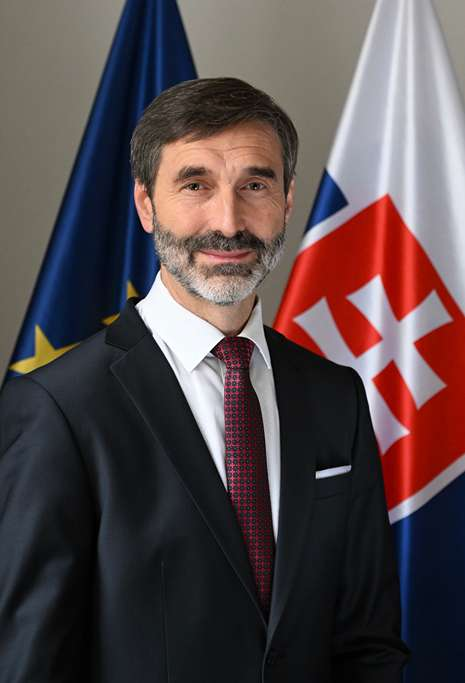
Slovakia
Juraj Blanár
Minister of Foreign and European Affairs

== Country comparison ==
Name	Republic of Austria Austria		Czech Republic Czechia		Hungary Hungary		Slovak Republic Slovakia		Republic of Slovenia Slovenia	
Name	Republik Österreich		Česká republika		Magyarország		Slovenská republika		Republika Slovenija	
Arms										
Flag										
Population	8,902,600 (2020)	3rd	10,693,939 (2020)	1st	9,772,756 (2019)	2nd	5,457,926 (2020)	4th	2,095,861 (2020)	5th
Area	83,879 km^{2}	2nd	78,866 km^{2}	3rd	93,030 km^{2}	1st	49,035 km^{2}	4th	20,271 km^{2}	5th
Government	Federal parliamentary constitutional republic		Unitary parliamentary constitutional republic		Unitary parliamentary constitutional republic		Unitary parliamentary constitutional republic		Unitary parliamentary constitutional republic	
Capital	Vienna		Prague		Budapest		Bratislava		Ljubljana	
Head of state	Alexander Van der Bellen (Ind.); President (2016–)		Petr Pavel (Ind.); President (2023–)		Tamás Sulyok (Independent); President (2024–)		Peter Pellegrini Voice – Social Democracy; President (2024–)		Nataša Pirc Musar (Ind.); President (2022–)	
Head of government	Christian Stocker(ÖVP/EPP); Federal Chancellor (2025–)		Petr Fiala (ODS/ECR); Prime Minister (2021–)		Péter Magyar (TISZA); Prime Minister (2026–)		Robert Fico (SMER/unaffiliated); Prime Minister (2023–)		Robert Golob (GS/RE); Prime Minister (2022–)	
Foreign minister	Beate Meinl-Reisinger (NEOS); Minister of European and International Affairs (2025–)		Jan Lipavský (Pirates/G-EFA); Minister of Foreign Affairs (2021–)		Anita Orbán (TISZA); Minister of Foreign Affairs(2026–)		Juraj Blanár (SMER/unaffiliated); Minister of Foreign Affairs and European Affairs (2023–)		Tanja Fajon (SD/S&D); Minister of Foreign Affairs (2022–)	
GDP (nominal)	$477.672 billion (2018)	1st	$261.732 billion (2020)	2nd	$180.498 billion (2020)	3rd	$111.874 billion (2020)	4th	$56 billion (2020)	5th
GDP (nominal) per capita	$53,764 (2018)	1st	$24,569 (2020)	3rd	$18,535 (2020)	5th	$20,495 (2020)	4th	$27,452 (2020)	2nd
GDP (PPP)	$461.432 billion (2018)	1st	$432.346 billion (2020)	2nd	$350.000 billion (2020)	3rd	$209.186 billion (2020)	4th	$83 billion (2020)	5th
GDP (PPP) per capita	$51,936 (2018)	1st	$40,585 (2020)	2nd	$35,941 (2020)	5th	$38,321 (2020)	4th	$40,343 (2020)	3rd
Currency	Euro (€) – EUR		Czech koruna (Kč) – CZK		Hungarian forint (Ft) – HUF		Euro (€) – EUR		Euro (€) – EUR	
HDI	0.914 (very high) (2018)	1st	0.891 (very high) (2018)	3rd	0.845 (very high) (2018)	5th	0.857 (very high) (2018)	4th	0.902 (very high) (2018)	2nd
Gini	27.5 (low) (2019)	4th	24.0 (low) (2019)	3rd	28.0 (low) (2019)	5th	20.9 (low) (2019)	1st	23.9 (low) (2019)	2nd

== Meetings ==
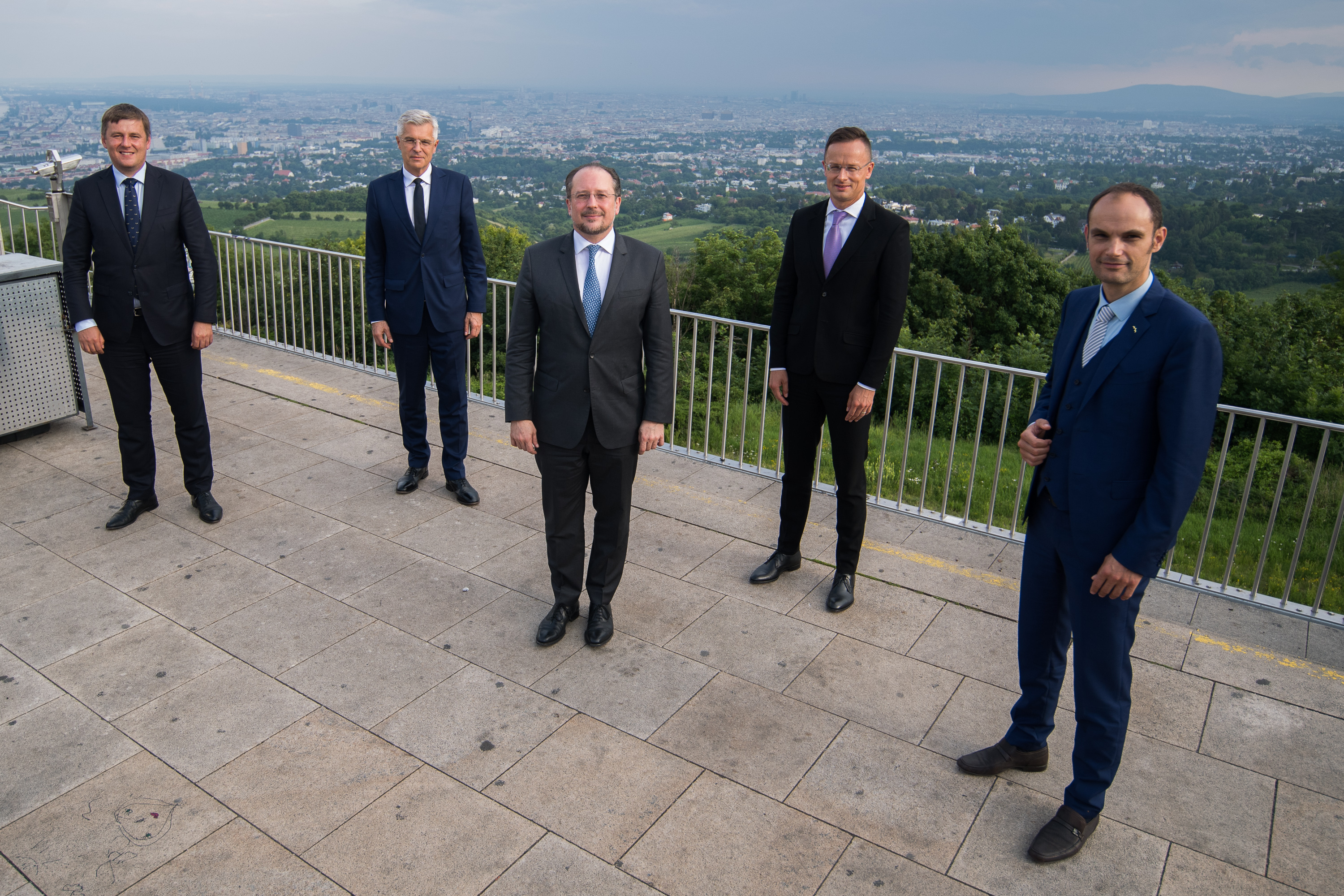
Central 5 meeting in Vienna, June 2020

Date	Place	Host
16 June 2020	Vienna, Austria	(Austria) Alexander Schallenberg, Minister of European and International Affairs
14 July 2020	Budapest, Hungary	(Hungary) Péter Szijjártó, Minister of Foreign Affairs and Trade
15 September 2020	Brdo pri Kranju, Slovenia	(Slovenia) Anže Logar, Minister of Foreign Affairs
12 November 2020	Virtual	No host
13 May 2021	Bratislava, Slovakia	(Slovakia) Ivan Korčok, Minister of Foreign and European Affairs
20 July 2021	(Czech Republic) Mělník, Czechia	(Czech Republic) Jakub Kulhánek, Minister of Foreign Affairs
12 April 2022	(Czech Republic) Kamenice, Czechia	(Czech Republic) Jan Lipavský, Minister of Foreign Affairs
13 June 2022	Budapest, Hungary	(Hungary) Péter Szijjártó, Minister of Foreign Affairs and Trade
27 September 2023	Vienna, Austria	(Austria) Alexander Schallenberg, Minister of European and International Affairs
26 March 2024	Ljubljana, Slovenia	(Slovenia) Tanja Fajon, Minister of Foreign Affairs
