= DR Class V 100 =

East German railway locomotive class

DR Class V 100 DR Class 108/110/111/112/114/199.8 DBAG Class 201/202/203/204/298
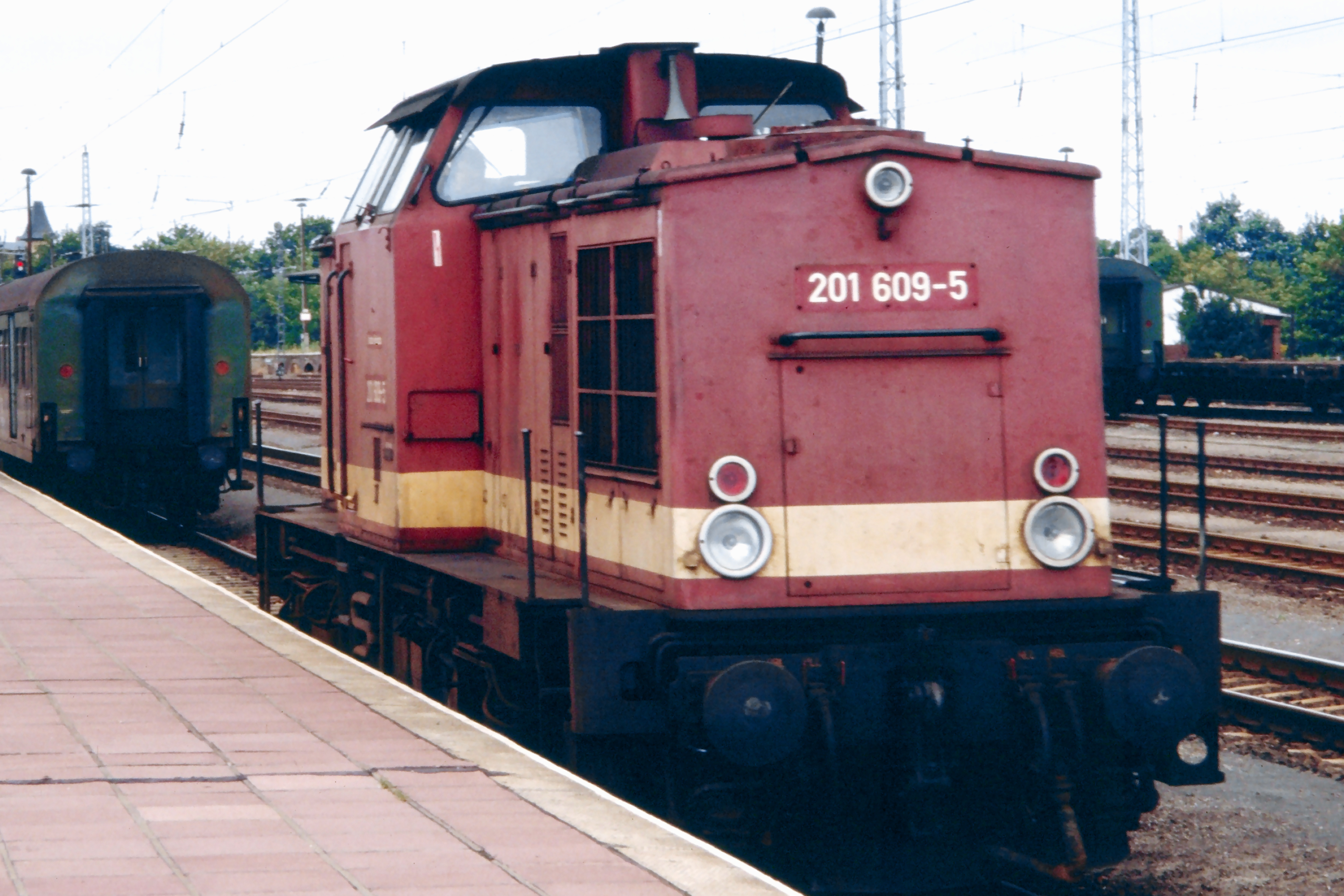
- DR 201 609-5 (ex 110 609) in Oranienburg station, August 1992
Type and origin
- Power type: Diesel-hydraulic
- Builder: LEW Hennigsdorf
- Build date: 1966–1985
Specifications
- Configuration
  - UIC: B′B′
  - Commonwealth: B-B
- Gauge: 1,435 mm (4 ft 8 1/2 in)
- Wheel diameter: 1,000 mm (3 ft 3 3/8 in)
- Wheelbase
  - Engine: 9,300 mm (30 ft 6 1/8 in)
  - Bogie: 2,300 mm (7 ft 6 1/2 in)
- Length
  - Over buffers: 13,940 mm (45 ft 8 7/8 in) / 14,240 mm (46 ft 8 5/8 in) (201.2–8, 204, 293)
- Axle load: 16.0 t (15.7 long tons; 17.6 short tons)
- Service weight: 64.0 t (63.0 long tons; 70.5 short tons)
- Fuel type: Diesel fuel
- Fuel capacity: 2,600 L (570 imp gal; 690 US gal)
- Prime mover: DR 110: MWJ 12 KVD 18-21 A-3; DR 112: MWJ 12 KVD 18-21 AL4; DR 114: MWJ 12 KVD 18-21 AL5; DR 108: MWJ 12 KVD 18-21 A5
- RPM range: 1,500 / 1,100 RPM
- Engine type: V12, 4 stroke diesel engine
- Aspiration: Exhaust-driven turbocharger (Supercharger) (partially intercooled)
- Transmission: hydrodynamic transmission
- Train heating: Köthen steam generator
- Loco brake: KE compressed-air brakes
Performance figures
- Maximum speed: 100 km/h (62 mph)
- Power output: DR 110: 736 kW (987 hp); DR 108: 750 kW (1,010 hp); DR 112: 883 kW (1,184 hp); DR 114: 1,100 kW (1,500 hp)
- Tractive effort
  - Starting: 227 kN (51,000 lb_{f}) / 155 kN (35,000 lb_{f})
Career
- Retired: from 1992

The DR Class V 100 (German: DR-Baureihe V 100), redesignated the Class 110 in 1970, was a four-axled diesel locomotive for medium duties operated by the Deutsche Reichsbahn of East Germany. Locomotives of the type were also supplied to railways in China and Czechoslovakia and to various industrial operators.

== Production ==
In all, 1,145 units of this class were built. The internal factory type designations of the engines should not be confused with their railway operator classes:

- 2 prototypes (1964)
- 867 as type V 100.1 as DR V100.0 class (subsequently 110.0 class) (1965–78)
- 59 of type V 100.2 for China (1974–76)
- 131 of type V 100.3 for China (1977–82)
- 68 of type V 100.4 as DR 111 class (37 locomotives) and various industrial users (1981–83)
- 18 of type V 100.5 as DR 110.9 class (11 locomotives in 1976/83) and CSD T476 class (7 locomotives in 1981)

== History (DR locomotives) ==
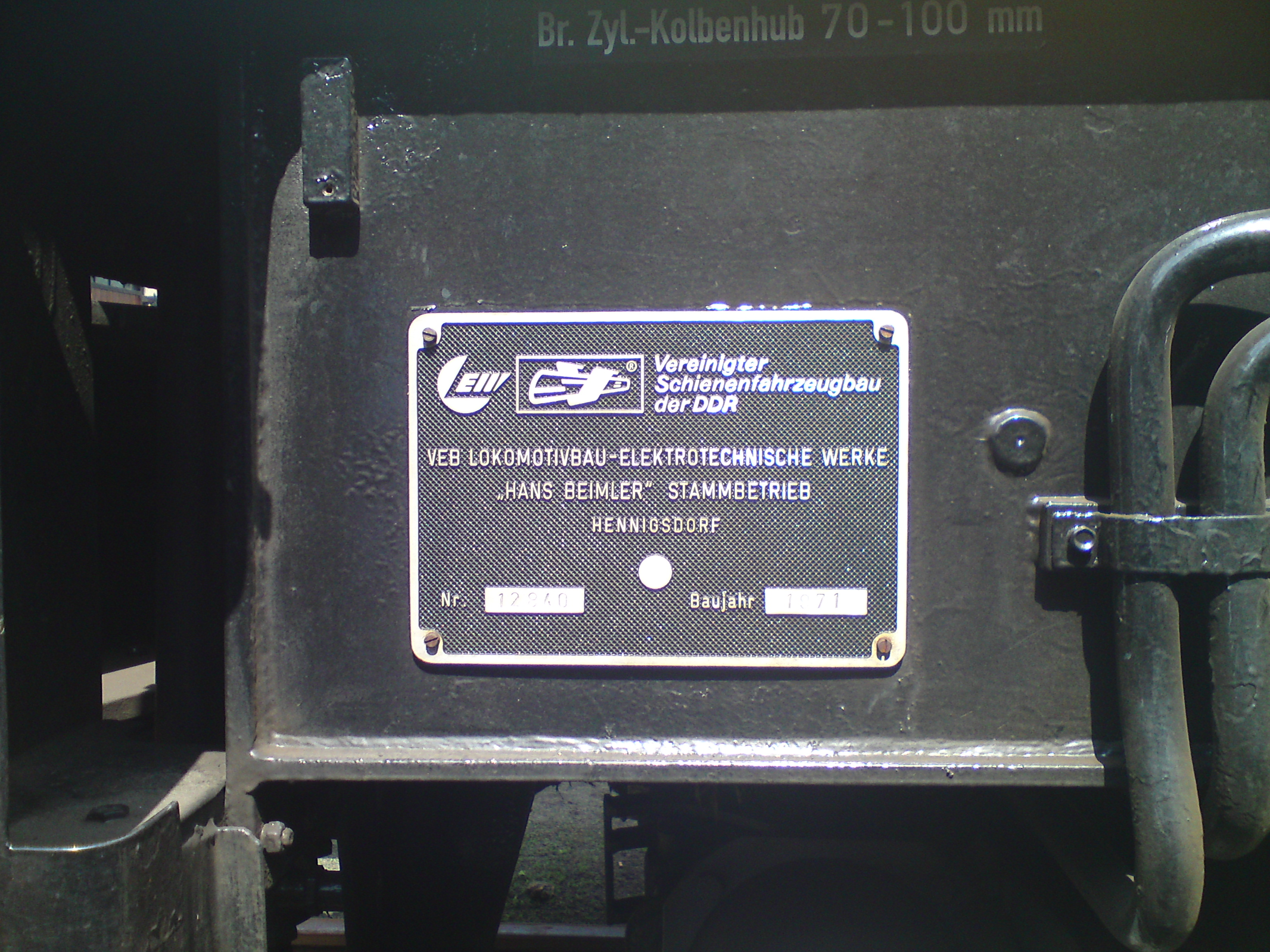
Factory plate of a V100

The programme established in the mid-1950s by the Deutsche Reichsbahn in East Germany to replace steam locomotives introduced the V 15, V 60, V 180 and V 240 diesel classes. However, it did not include an engine of about 1,000 horsepower (750 kW) for light to medium passenger and goods train duties or for heavy shunting work, which could have replaced steam locomotive classes 38, 55, 57, 78 and 93. This gap was initially to be filled by importing engines based on the Soviet TGM3 class. But when it became clear that the Soviet Union was not in a position to supply these locomotives, the DR began developing its own 1,000 hp (746 kW) diesel engine in 1963, which was to use as many of the components of the V 180 as possible.

The result was a four-axled diesel locomotive with a central driver's cab and hydraulic transmission designed by the firm of Lokomotivbau Karl Marx Babelsberg (LKM). The first prototype (in blue livery) of 1964 still had the well-known 900 hp (671 kW) engine from the V 180; but the second prototype in 1965 (in red livery) was given the 1,000 hp (746 kW) engine of Type 12 KVD 18/21 A-3 from VEB Motorenwerk Johannisthal. The two prototypes were not taken over by the Deutsche Reichsbahn and were later destroyed in a major fire in the repair shop at Cottbus. Their numbers were later re-used.

After it became clear that series production would take place at Lokomotivbau Elektrotechnische Werke Hans Beimler Hennigsdorf, they built a further prototype in 1966 (number V 100 003). This (third and oldest surviving) loco is now owned by the Berlin-Anhalt Railway Society (Förderverein Berlin-Anhaltische Eisenbahn) in the Martin Luther town of Wittenberg and sports its original livery (cream with green stripes). One year later, production started. In the years that followed, the V 100 replaced almost all state railway locomotives on medium duties and thus hauled all types of train, working all over East Germany. In the 1970 DR fleet renumbering, class V 100 became class 110. The last of the main series of 867 locomotives for DR was built in 1978 (numbers 110 001-171 and 110 201-896).

Subsequent deliveries to DR included 11 class 110.9 locomotives for departmental (i.e. non-revenue) use, which were equipped to provide power to track maintenance machinery and snow blowers. Finally 37 class 111 locomotives were built for shunting purposes, these lacking train heating apparatus having extra ballast to increase traction. Many of the locomotives were rebuilt and renumbered during their lives:

- DR class 108 (DBAG class 298.0) - class 110.0 rebuilt as shunting locomotives;
- DR class 110.0 (DBAG class 201) - mixed traffic locomotives as built;
- DR class 110.9 (DBAG class 710) - departmental locomotives as built:
- DR class 111 (DBAG class 293) - shunting locomotives as built (later rebuilt as DBAG class 298.3);
- DR class 112 (DBAG class 202) - class 110.0 rebuilt with 883 kW engines;
- DR class 114 (DBAG class 204) - class 110.0 rebuilt with 1100 kW engines;
- DR class 115 - original designation for class 114 (when class 114 was intended for 1029 kW rebuilds);
- DR class 199 (DBAG class 299) - class 110.0 rebuilt to run on metre gauge lines;
- DBAG class 203 - class 202 rebuilt with 1380 kW engines

After the merger of the West and East German railways to create Deutsche Bahn AG, the large fleet of this very robust and reliable East German locomotive was no longer wanted on German rails. An unusual problem arose with a rolling motion that was traced to the wheel profile. On newly laid and ground rails the engine rocked at high speeds. The Deutsche Bahn finally reduced its permitted maximum speed to 80 km/h (50 mph), which meant it could be taken out of service because this speed was too low for duties on main lines. Individual locomotives were later equipped with special shock absorbers on their bogies to counter the rocking motion.

=== Harzkamel ===
In November 1988, the first of what was planned to be 30 locomotives were converted to metre-gauge for use on the Harz Narrow Gauge Railways, where they were intended to eliminate the use of steam locomotives in everyday service. To reduce the axle load the metre-gauge bogies each have three axles. The locomotives were renumbered as class 199.8 and became known as the "Harzkamel" as they towered over the narrow gauge vehicles. After the fall of the Berlin Wall in 1989 goods traffic decreased and tourism became more important so due to opposition by locals, tourist bodies and employees the scheme was cut back and only 10 locomotives were converted, working alongside steam. Four have since been converted back to standard-gauge locomotives and of the remaining six only three remain in use, principally on freight, shunting, and snow ploughing duties. At times of high fire risk or when there are shortages of serviceable equipment the 199.8 are also used on passenger trains.
