= Nokia C5 =

Nokia C5 can refer to

- Nokia C5-00, a smartphone with a regular telephone keypad and a screen size of 2.2 inch (5.6 cm).
- Nokia C5-03, a touchscreen smartphone with WLAN and a screen size of 3.2 inch (8.1 cm), announced in October 2010.
- Nokia C5 Endi, an Android smartphone and a screen size of 6.5 inch (16.5 cm), announced in May 2020.
