= AdvoCare V100 Bowl =

AdvoCare V100 Bowl may refer to one of the following American college football bowl games:

== Independence Bowl ==
- 2009 Independence Bowl (Georgia defeated Texas A&M)
- 2010 Independence Bowl (Air Force defeated Georgia Tech)
- 2011 Independence Bowl (Missouri defeated North Carolina)
- 2012 Independence Bowl (Ohio defeated Louisiana–Monroe)
- 2013 AdvoCare V100 Bowl (Arizona defeated Boston College)

== Texas Bowl ==
- 2014 Texas Bowl (Arkansas defeated Texas)
- 2015 Texas Bowl (LSU defeated Texas Tech)
- 2016 Texas Bowl (Kansas State defeated Texas A&M)
