= C5a peptidase =

Identifiers
- EC no.: 3.4.21.110
- CAS no.: 100179-39-3

Databases
- BRENDA: enzyme data
- ExPASy: NiceZyme view
- KEGG: enzyme entry
- MetaCyc: metabolic pathway
- Rhea: reactions
- PDB structures: RCSB PDB PDBe PDBsum
Search
- PMC: articles
- PubMed: articles
- NCBI: proteins

C5a peptidase (EC 3.4.21.110, streptococcal C5a peptidase, ScpA, ScpB, SCPA) is an enzyme. The primary cleavage site is at His^{67}-Lys^{68} in human C5a with a minor secondary cleavage site at Ala^{58}-Ser^{59}.

This enzyme is a surface-associated subtilisin-like serine peptidase with very specific substrate preference.
