= Việt Cường =

Việt Cường may refer to:

== People ==
- Viet Cuong (composer) (born 1990), U.S. composer

== Places ==
Việt Cường may also refer to several commune-level subdivisions in Vietnam, including:

- Việt Cường, Hưng Yên, a commune of Yên Mỹ District
- Việt Cường, Yên Bái, a commune of Trấn Yên District

== See also ==
- Đoàn Việt Cường, a Vietnamese footballer
