= Five Cs of Singapore =

Singaporean cultural phrase

The "Five Cs of Singapore"—namely, cash, car, credit card, condominium and country club—is a phrase used in Singapore to refer to the materialist mindset and expectations viewed as prevalent in Singaporean society. It was coined as a popular observational joke during the 1990s about the materialistic aspirations of some Singaporeans who tend to seek constantly to obtain material possessions in an effort to impress others.

== Overview ==
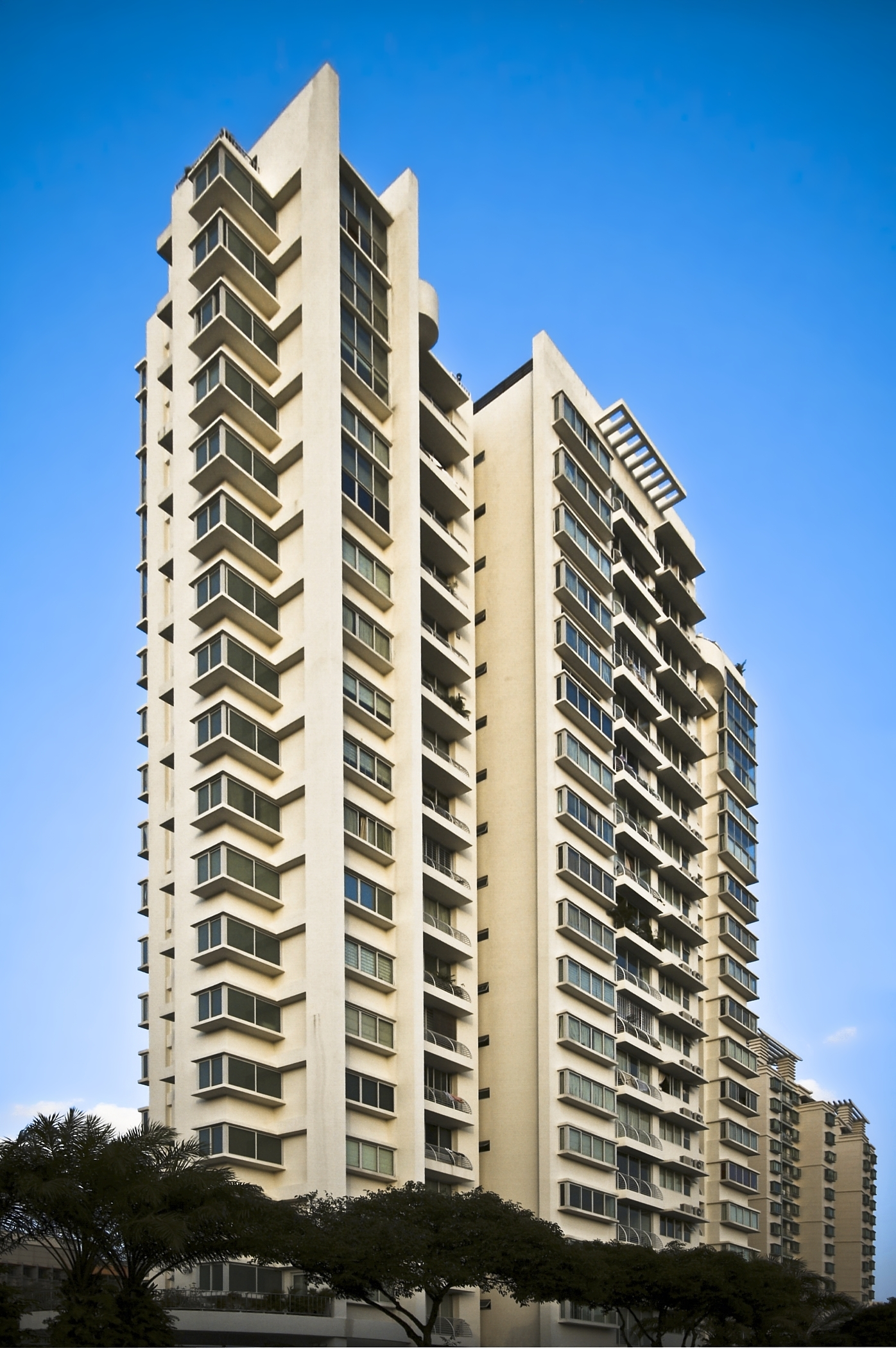
Condominiums are usually considered by many as one of the fundamental "five Cs".

=== Cash ===
Cash refers to spending power rather than physical currency. Financial security and affluence is a status symbol worldwide and for much of contemporary human history was the measure of personal worth and success.

=== Car ===
The car ownership rate in Singapore is roughly 11%. In comparison, it is 50% in the European Union and 80% in the United States. As part of the government's continued efforts to make Singapore a "car-lite society" and reduce car dependency, only around 33% of Singaporean and permanent resident households own cars in Singapore in 2023, down from 40% in 2013.

Although cars are an abundance in most countries and are not seen as status symbol (except only for luxury cars), high taxation on the import and ownership of motor vehicles (191% on new vehicles, an annual road tax based on engine size, and high pump prices) and a quota system requiring owners to acquire a costly Certificate of Entitlement (COE) has uniquely made car ownership a symbol of wealth in a land-constrained country such as Singapore.

=== Credit card ===
Credit cards are a visible symbol of success. Singapore's financial regulator, the Monetary Authority of Singapore, has stipulated a maximum personal credit limit of two months' income given personal income less than S$30,000, or four months' income for all others. Banks typically issue different types of cards depending on the available credit limit, associating greater cachet with cards that offer a higher limit.

=== Condominium ===
In Singapore, privately developed apartments (colloquially known as condominiums or condos) reflect a higher wealth status as compared to public housing also known as HDBs which are public apartments built, sold and subsidised by the government. Up to 80% of Singaporeans live in public housing throughout the country, as land in Singapore is at a premium, meaning that freestanding and sometimes freehold houses are rare and signify even greater affluence, especially old money.

=== Country Club ===
In Singapore, there is a small amount of country clubs which leads to limited expensive membership. Access to membership to country clubs is viewed as exclusivity and an indicator of power and wealth.

== New Five Cs ==
In 2019, it was published that a "new" Five Cs has emerged since the 2010s among Singaporean white-collar workers, with lesser emphasis on materialism. While cash was retained, other C's can now include culture, credibility, career and convenience, among others.

In a web conference of local newspaper Today in 2021, it has been argued that newer generations of Singaporeans are now less materialistic and do not value the original Five Cs as much, and that they have redefined what constitutes as success and priorities in life. A panellist added that they now opt to work for a job that they are passionate in, with the intention to "make a difference", rather than just working for a salary.
