= Fifth Cambridge Survey of Radio Sources =

Astronomical catalogue

- Alternative names: 5C
- Website: vizier.cfa.harvard.edu/viz-bin/VizieR?-source=J%2FMNRAS%2F171%2F475

The 5C Survey of Radio Sources (5C) is an astronomical catalogue of celestial radio sources as measured at 408 MHz and 1407 MHz. It was published in a number of parts between 1975 and 1995 by the Radio Astronomy Group of the University of Cambridge. The One-Mile Telescope used to produce this catalogue had an angular resolution of 80 arcseconds and 23 arcseconds at 408 MHz and 1407 MHz respectively, and catalogued radio sources as faint as 2 milli-Janskys, considerably fainter than any previously catalogued radio source.

References to entries in this catalogue use the prefix 5C followed by the catalogue part, a "." and then the entry number, with no space perforce; i.e., 5C12.311 for the 311th entry in part 12 of the 5C catalogue.
