= First Cambridge Catalogue of Radio Sources =

Astronomical catalogue

- Alternative names: 1C

The First Cambridge Catalogue of Radio Sources (1C) refers to the catalogue listed in the article Ryle M, Smith F G & Elsmore B (1950) MNRAS vol 110 pp508-523 "A Preliminary Survey of Radio Stars in the Northern Hemisphere".

The 1C catalogue listed about 50 radio sources, detected at 3.7 m with a fixed meridian interferometer. According to researchers at the Special Astrophysical Observatory , most of the sources from 1C were later recognized to be the effect of confusion, i.e. they were not real objects.

The survey was produced using the Long Michelson Interferometer at the Old Rifle Range in Cambridge in 1950. This device operated primarily at a wavelength of 3.7 metres, with an aperture of 110λ, and was operated using Ryle's phase switching technique. Francis Graham-Smith also used the interferometer to measure the electron density in the ionosphere.

The catalogue from this survey is only informally known as the 1C catalogue.

== List of sources ==
Number	RA	Error	Dec	Error	Intensity§	Magnitude	Current designation
00.01	04h42m	±6m	38°	±5°	4	3.5	
01.01	01h25m	±5m	30°	±3°	8	2.8	

After Ryle, et al.

§ Intensity is in Watts metres^{−2} (c./s.)^{−1} × 10^{25}

Note that the position can be specified more accurately for sources of small declination, since the nature of the instrument is such as to make the table errors overstated if the axis is not exactly East-West.

== Results ==
The survey found radio sources in close proximity to four of the five major extragalactic nebulae, namely M31, M33, M101 and M51, corresponding to sources 00.01, 01.01, 14.01 and 13.01 respectively. Only M81 had no observed radio source.

The isotropy of the sources lead the team to conclude that radio stars were either local phenomena, or extragalactic.

== See also ==
- Second Cambridge Catalogue of Radio Sources
- Third Cambridge Catalogue of Radio Sources
- Fourth Cambridge Survey of Radio Sources
- Fifth Cambridge Survey of Radio Sources
- Sixth Cambridge Survey of Radio Sources
- Seventh Cambridge Survey of Radio Sources
- Eighth Cambridge Survey of Radio Sources
- Ninth Cambridge Survey of Radio Sources
- Tenth Cambridge Survey of Radio Sources
