= Cambridge Catalogue of Radio Sources =

The Cambridge Catalogue of Radio Sources may refer to:

- First Cambridge Catalogue of Radio Sources
- Second Cambridge Catalogue of Radio Sources
- Third Cambridge Catalogue of Radio Sources
- Fourth Cambridge Survey
- Fifth Cambridge Survey of Radio Sources
- Sixth Cambridge Survey of radio sources
- Seventh Cambridge Survey
- Eighth Cambridge Survey
- Ninth Cambridge survey at 15GHz
- Tenth Cambridge survey
