= William Duncan MacMillan =

American mathematician and astronomer (1871–1948)

- W. D. MacMillan, University of Chicago, 1920s
- Born: July 24, 1871; La Crosse, Wisconsin, USA
- Died: November 14, 1948 (aged 77); Saint Paul, Minnesota, USA
- Scientific career
- Fields: Astronomy, mathematics and physics
- Thesis: Periodic Orbits about an Oblate Spheroid (1908)
- Doctoral advisor: Forest Ray Moulton
- Doctoral students: William Markowitz

William Duncan MacMillan (July 24, 1871 – November 14, 1948) was an American mathematician and astronomer on the faculty of the University of Chicago. He published research on the applications of classical mechanics to astronomy, and is noted for pioneering speculations on physical cosmology. For the latter, Helge Kragh noted, "the cosmological model proposed by MacMillan was designed to lend support to a cosmic optimism, which he felt was threatened by the world view of modern physics."

== Biography ==
He was born in La Crosse, Wisconsin, to D. D. MacMillan, who was in the lumber business, and Mary Jane McCrea. His brother, John H. MacMillan, headed the Cargill Corporation from 1909 to 1936. MacMillan graduated from La Crosse High School in 1888. In 1889, he attended Lake Forest College, then entered the University of Virginia. Later in 1898, he earned an A.B. degree from Fort Worth University, which was then a Methodist university in Texas. He performed his graduate work at the University of Chicago, earning a master's degree in 1906 and a PhD in astronomy in 1908. In 1907, prior to completing his PhD, he joined the staff of the University of Chicago as a research assistant in geology. In 1908, he became an associate in mathematics, then in 1909, he began instruction in astronomy at the same institution. His career as a professor began in 1912 when he became an assistant professor. In 1917, when the U.S. declared war on Germany, Dr. MacMillan served as a major in the U.S. army's ordnance department during World War I. Following the war, he became associate professor in 1919, then full professor in 1924. MacMillan retired in 1936.

In a 1958 paper about MacMillan's work on cosmology, Richard Schlegel introduced MacMillan as "best known to physicists for his three-volume Classical Mechanics" that remained in print for decades after MacMillan's 1936 retirement. MacMillan published extensively on the mathematics of the orbits of planets and stars. In the 1920s, MacMillan developed a cosmology that presumed an unchanging, steady-state model of the universe. This was uncontroversial at the time, and indeed in 1918, Albert Einstein had also sought to adapt his relativity theories to the model using a cosmological constant. MacMillan accepted that the radiance of stars came from then unknown processes that converted their mass into radiant energy. This perspective suggested that individual stars and the universe itself would ultimately go dark, which was called the "heat death" of the universe. MacMillan avoided the conclusion about the universe through a mechanism later known as the "tired-light hypothesis". He speculated that the light emitted by stars might recreate matter in its travels through space.

MacMillan's work on cosmology lost influence in the 1930s after Hubble's law became accepted. Edwin Hubble's 1929 publication, and earlier work by Georges Lemaître, reported on observations of entire galaxies far from the earth and its galaxy. The further away a galaxy is, the faster it is apparently moving away from the earth. Hubble's law strongly suggested that universe is expanding. In 1948, a new version of a steady-state cosmology was proposed by Bondi, Gold, and Hoyle that was consistent with the measurements on distant galaxies. While the authors were apparently not aware of MacMillan's earlier work, substantial similarities exist. With the observation of the cosmic microwave background (CMB) in 1965, steady-state models of the universe have been rejected by most astronomers and physicists. The CMB is a prediction of the Big Bang model of an expanding universe.

MacMillan also had a distaste for Einstein's relativity theories. In a published debate in 1927, Macmillan invoked "postulates of normal intuition" to argue against them. He objected to the theories' inconsistency with an absolute scale of time. Einstein's theories predict that an observer will see that rapidly moving clocks tick more slowly than the observer's own clock. Later experiments amply confirmed this "time dilation" prediction of relativity theory.

In an Associated Press report, MacMillan speculated on the nature of interstellar civilizations, believing that they would be vastly more advanced than our own. "Out in the heavens, perhaps, are civilizations as far above ours as we are above the single cell, since they are so much older than ours."

The crater MacMillan on the Moon is named in his honor.

== Selected publications ==
- MacMillan, W. D. (1910). "A new proof of the theorem of Weierstrass concerning the factorization of a power series". Bulletin of the American Mathematical Society. 17 (3): 116–120. doi:10.1090/S0002-9904-1910-02012-7.
- —— (1910). "Periodic orbits about an oblate spheroid". Transactions of the American Mathematical Society. 11: 55–120. doi:10.1090/S0002-9947-1910-1500856-2. hdl:2027/mdp.39015076513343.
- —— (1912). "An existence theorem for periodic solutions". Transactions of the American Mathematical Society. 13 (2): 146–158. doi:10.1090/S0002-9947-1912-1500911-9.
- —— (1913). "On Poincaré's correction to Bruns' theorem". Bulletin of the American Mathematical Society. 19 (7): 349–355. doi:10.1090/S0002-9904-1913-02367-X.
- —— (1915). "Convergence of the series $\sum_{i=0}^{\infty} \left(\sum_{j=0}^{\infty} \frac {x^i y^j} {i-j\gamma} \right).$ ($\gamma$ irrational)". Bulletin of the American Mathematical Society. 22: 26–32. doi:10.1090/S0002-9904-1915-02712-6.
- —— (1916). "A reduction of certain analytic differential equations to differential equations of an algebraic type". Transactions of the American Mathematical Society. 17 (3): 245–258. doi:10.1090/S0002-9947-1916-1501040-4. S2CID 122933745. 1916
- —— (1918). "On the reduction of certain differential equations of the second order". Transactions of the American Mathematical Society. 19 (2): 205–222. doi:10.1090/S0002-9947-1918-1501098-4.
- MacMillan, William Duncan (1918). "On Stellar Evolution". Astrophysical Journal. 48: 35. Bibcode:1918ApJ....48...35M. doi:10.1086/142412.
- "Cosmic Evolution. First part: What is the source of stellar energies?". Scientia. xxxiii: 3. 1923.
- "Cosmic Evolution. Second part: The organization and dissipation of matter through the agency of radiant energy". Scientia. xxxiii: 103. 1923.
- MacMillan, William D. (1925). "Some Mathematical Aspects of Cosmology". Science. 62 (1597): 121–127. Bibcode:1925Sci....62..121M. doi:10.1126/science.62.1597.121. JSTOR 1649176. PMID 17812839..
- Statics and the dynamics of a particle. New York: McGraw-Hill. 1927. OCLC 923401450.. Later reprinted by Dover, 1958, ISBN 1-124-11132-8.
- The Theory of the Potential. New York: McGraw-Hill. 1930. OCLC 826376. Reprinted by Dover, 1958, ISBN 9780486604862.
- "Permanent Configurations in the Problem of Four Bodies". Transactions of the American Mathematical Society. 34 (4). with Walter Bartky: 838–875. October 1932. doi:10.2307/1989432. JSTOR 1989432.
- MacMillan, W. D. (1932). "Velocities of the Spiral Nebulae" (PDF). Nature. 129 (3246): 93. Bibcode:1932Natur.129...93M. doi:10.1038/129093a0. S2CID 4126582.
- Dynamics of Rigid Bodies. New York: McGraw Hill. 1936. OCLC 221899817. Later reprinted by Dover, 1960, OCLC 768575337.

== See also ==
- Sitnikov problem
- Static universe
