= Tired light =

Class of hypothetical redshift mechanisms

Tired light is a class of hypothetical redshift mechanisms that was proposed as an alternative explanation for the redshift-distance relationship. These models have been proposed as alternatives to the models that involve the expansion of the universe. The concept was first proposed in 1929 by Fritz Zwicky, who suggested that if photons lost energy over time through collisions with other particles in a regular way, the more distant objects would appear redder than more nearby ones.

Zwicky acknowledged that any sort of scattering of light would blur the images of distant objects more than what is seen. Additionally, the surface brightness of galaxies evolving with time, time dilation of cosmological sources, and a thermal spectrum of the cosmic microwave background have been observed—these effects should not be present if the cosmological redshift was due to any tired light scattering mechanism. Despite periodic re-examination of the concept, tired light has not been supported by observational tests and remains a fringe topic in astrophysics.

== History and reception ==
Tired light was an idea that came about due to the observation made by Edwin Hubble that distant galaxies have redshifts proportional to their distance. Redshift is a shift in the spectrum of the emitted electromagnetic radiation from an object toward lower energies and frequencies, associated with the phenomenon of the Doppler effect. Observers of spiral nebulae such as Vesto Slipher observed that these objects (now known to be separate galaxies) generally exhibited redshift rather than blueshifts independent of where they were located. Since the relation holds in all directions it cannot be attributed to normal movement with respect to a background which would show an assortment of redshifts and blueshifts. Hubble's contribution was to show that the magnitude of the redshift correlated strongly with the distance to the galaxies.

Basing on Slipher's and Hubble's data, in 1927 Georges Lemaître realized that this correlation could fit non-static solutions to the equations of Einstein's theory of gravity, the Friedmann–Lemaître solutions. However Lemaître's article was appreciated only after Hubble's publication of 1929. The universal redshift-distance relation in this solution is attributable to the effect an expanding universe has on a photon traveling on a null spacetime interval (also known as a "light-like" geodesic). In this formulation, there was still an analogous effect to the Doppler effect, though relative velocities need to be handled with more care since distances can be defined in different ways in an expanding universe.

At the same time, other explanations were proposed that did not concord with general relativity. Edward Milne proposed an explanation compatible with special relativity but not general relativity that there was a giant explosion that could explain redshifts (see Milne universe). Others proposed that systematic effects could explain the redshift-distance correlation. Along this line, Fritz Zwicky proposed a "tired light" mechanism in 1929. Zwicky suggested that photons might slowly lose energy as they travel vast distances through a static universe by interaction with matter or other photons, or by some novel physical mechanism. Since a decrease in energy corresponds to an increase in light's wavelength, this effect would produce a redshift in spectral lines that increase proportionally with the distance of the source. The term "tired light" was coined by Richard Tolman in the early 1930s as a way to refer to this idea. Helge Kragh has noted "Zwicky’s hypothesis was the best known and most elaborate alternative to the expanding universe, but it was far from the only one. More than a dozen physicists, astronomers and amateur scientists proposed in the 1930s tired-light ideas having in common the assumption of nebular photons interacting with intergalactic matter to which they transferred part of their energy." Kragh noted in particular John Quincy Stewart, William Duncan MacMillan, and Walther Nernst.

Tired light mechanisms were among the proposed alternatives to the Big Bang and the Steady State cosmologies, both of which relied on the general relativistic expansion of the universe of the FRW metric. Through the middle of the twentieth century, most cosmologists supported one of these two paradigms, but there were a few scientists, especially those who were working on alternatives to general relativity, who worked with the tired light alternative. As the discipline of observational cosmology developed in the late twentieth century and the associated data became more numerous and accurate, the Big Bang emerged as the cosmological theory most supported by the observational evidence, and it remains the accepted consensus model with a current parametrization that precisely specifies the state and evolution of the universe. Although the proposals of "tired light cosmologies" are now more-or-less relegated to the dustbin of history, as a completely alternative proposal tired-light cosmologies were considered a remote possibility worthy of some consideration in cosmology texts well into the 1980s, though it was dismissed as an unlikely and ad hoc proposal by mainstream astrophysicists.

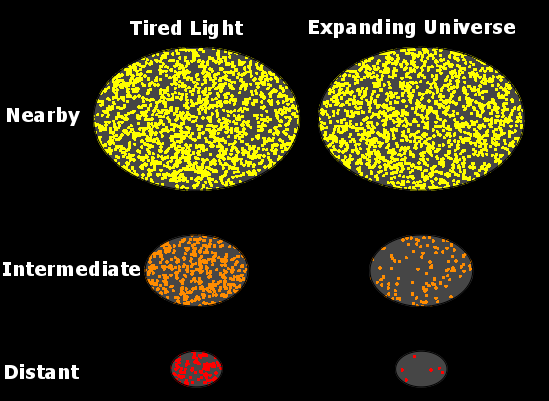
The Tolman surface brightness test rules out the tired light explanation for the cosmological redshift.

By the 1990s and on into the twenty-first century, a number of falsifying observations have shown that "tired light" hypotheses are not viable explanations for cosmological redshifts. For example, in a static universe with tired light mechanisms, the surface brightness of stars and galaxies should be constant, that is, the farther an object is, the less light we receive, but its apparent area diminishes as well, so the light received divided by the apparent area should be constant. In an expanding universe, the surface brightness diminishes with distance. As the observed object recedes, photons are emitted at a reduced rate because each photon has to travel a distance that is a little longer than the previous one, while its energy is reduced a little because of increasing redshift at a larger distance. On the other hand, in an expanding universe, the object appears to be larger than it really is, because it was closer to us when the photons started their travel. This causes a difference in surface brilliance of objects between a static and an expanding Universe. This is known as the Tolman surface brightness test that in those studies favors the expanding universe hypothesis and rules out static tired light models.

Redshift is directly observable and used by cosmologists as a direct measure of lookback time. They often refer to age and distance to objects in terms of redshift rather than years or light-years. In such a scale, the Big Bang corresponds to a redshift of infinity. Alternative theories of gravity that do not have an expanding universe in them need an alternative to explain the correspondence between redshift and distance that is sui generis to the expanding metrics of general relativity. Such theories are sometimes referred to as "tired-light cosmologies", though not all authors are necessarily aware of the historical antecedents.

== Specific falsified models ==
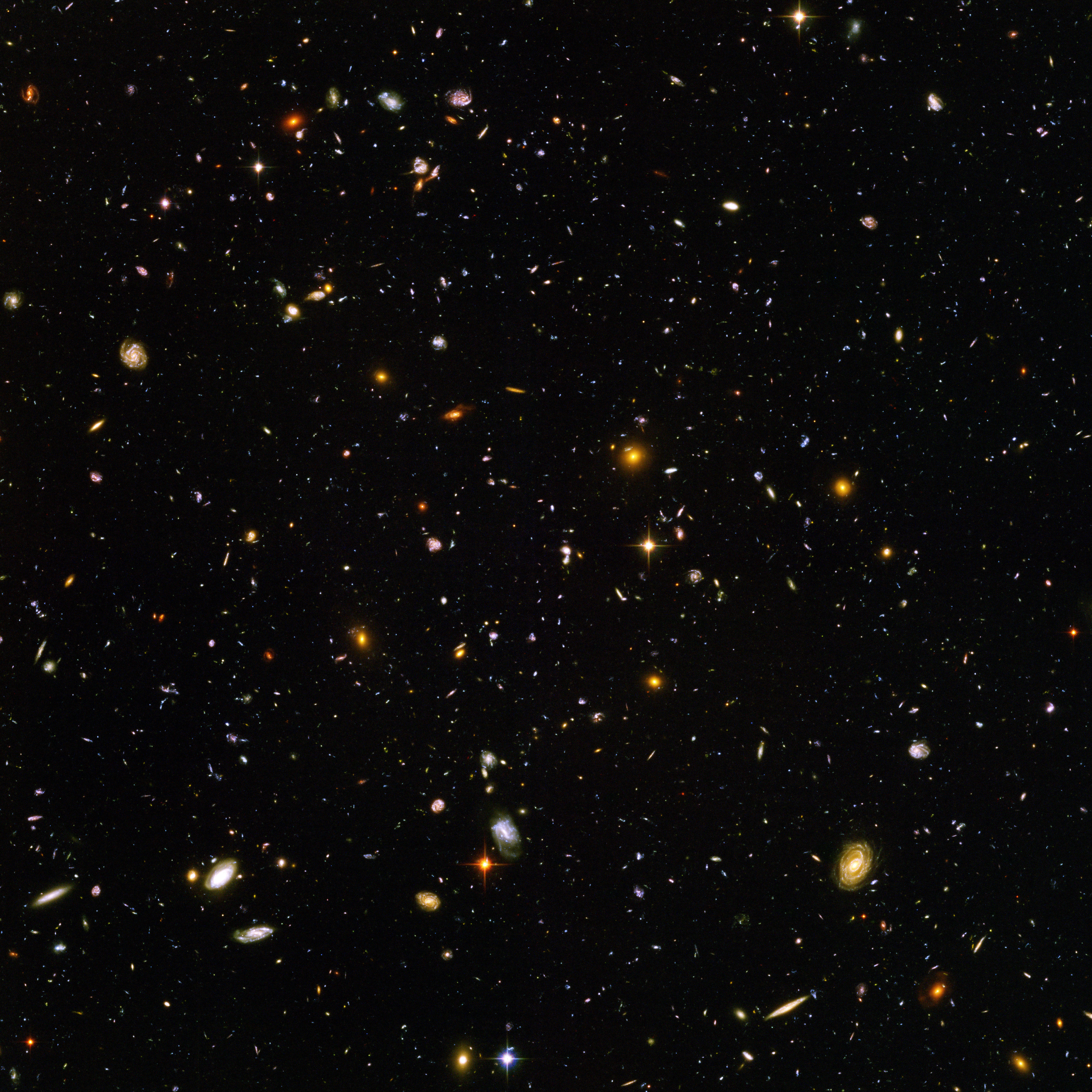
The Hubble Ultra Deep Field is an image of galaxies that are in excess of 10 billion light years away. If tired light was a correct explanation, these galaxies would appear blurred in comparison to closer galaxies. That they do not rules out the suggestion that scattering processes are causing the redshift-distance relation.

In general, any "tired light" mechanism must solve some basic problems, in that the observed redshift must:

- admit the same measurement in any wavelength-band
- not exhibit blurring
- follow the detailed Hubble relation observed with supernova data (see accelerating universe)
- explain associated time dilation of cosmologically distant events.

A number of tired light mechanisms have been suggested over the years. Fritz Zwicky, in his paper proposing these models investigated a number of redshift explanations, ruling out some himself. The simplest form of a tired light theory assumes an exponential decrease in photon energy with distance traveled:$E(x)=E_0 \exp\left(-\frac{x}{R_0}\right)$where $E(x)$ is the energy of the photon at distance $x$ from the source of light, $E_0$ is the energy of the photon at the source of light, and $R_0$ is a large constant characterizing the "resistance of the space". To correspond to Hubble's law, the constant $R_0$ must be several gigaparsecs. For example, Zwicky considered whether an integrated Compton effect could account for the scale normalization of the above model:

... light coming from distant nebulae would undergo a shift to the red by Compton effect on those free electrons [in interstellar spaces] [...] But then the light scattered in all directions would make the interstellar space intolerably opaque which disposes of the above explanation. [...] it is evident that any explanation based on a scattering process like the Compton effect or the Raman effect, etc., will be in a hopeless position regarding the good definition of the images.

This expected "blurring" of cosmologically distant objects is not seen in the observational evidence, though it would take much larger telescopes than those available at that time to show this with certainty. Alternatively, Zwicky proposed a kind of Sachs–Wolfe effect explanation for the redshift distance relation:

One might expect a shift of spectral lines due to the difference of the static gravitational potential at different distances from the center of a galaxy. This effect, of course, has no relation to the distance of the observed galaxy from our own system and, therefore, cannot provide any explanation of the phenomenon discussed in this paper.

Zwicky's proposals were carefully presented as falsifiable according to later observations:

... [a] gravitational analogue of the Compton effect [...] It is easy to see that the above redshift should broaden these absorption lines asymmetrically toward the red. If these lines can be photographed with a high enough dispersion, the displacement of the center of gravity of the line will give the redshift independent of the velocity of the system from which the light is emitted.

Such broadening of absorption lines is not seen in high-redshift objects, thus falsifying this particular hypothesis.

Zwicky also notes, in the same paper, that according to a tired light model a distance-redshift relationship would necessarily be present in the light from sources within our own galaxy (even if the redshift would be so small that it would be hard to measure), that do not appear under a recessional-velocity based theory. He writes, referring to sources of light within our galaxy: "It is especially desirable to determine the redshift independent of the proper velocities of the objects observed". Subsequent to this, astronomers have patiently mapped out the three-dimensional velocity-position phase space for the galaxy and found the redshifts and blueshifts of galactic objects to accord well with the statistical distribution of a spiral galaxy, eliminating the intrinsic redshift component as an effect.

Following after Zwicky in 1935, Edwin Hubble and Richard Tolman compared recessional redshift with a non-recessional one, writing that they

both incline to the opinion, however, that if the red-shift is not due to recessional motion, its explanation will probably involve some quite new physical principles [... and] use of a static Einstein model of the universe, combined with the assumption that the photons emitted by a nebula lose energy on their journey to the observer by some unknown effect, which is linear with distance, and which leads to a decrease in frequency, without appreciable transverse deflection.

These conditions became almost impossible to meet and the overall success of general relativistic explanations for the redshift-distance relation is one of the core reasons that the Big Bang model of the universe remains the cosmology preferred by researchers.

In the early 1950s, Erwin Finlay-Freundlich proposed a redshift as "the result of loss of energy by observed photons traversing a radiation field". which was cited and argued for as an explanation for the redshift-distance relation in a 1962 astrophysics theory Nature paper by University of Manchester physics professor P. F. Browne. The pre-eminent cosmologist Ralph Asher Alpher wrote a letter to Nature three months later in response to this suggestion heavily criticizing the approach, "No generally accepted physical mechanism has been proposed for this loss." Still, until the so-called "Age of Precision Cosmology" was ushered in with results from the WMAP space probe and modern redshift surveys, tired light models could occasionally get published in the mainstream journals, including one that was published in the February 1979 edition of Nature proposing "photon decay" in a curved spacetime that was five months later criticized in the same journal as being wholly inconsistent with observations of the gravitational redshift observed in the solar limb. In 1986, a paper claiming tired light theories explained redshift better than cosmic expansion was published in the Astrophysical Journal, but ten months later, in the same journal, such tired light models were shown to be inconsistent with extant observations. As cosmological measurements became more precise and the statistics in cosmological data sets improved, tired light proposals ended up being falsified, to the extent that the theory was described in 2001 by science writer Charles Seife as being "firmly on the fringe of physics 30 years ago; still, scientists sought more direct proofs of the expansion of the cosmos".

== See also ==
- Dispersion (optics)
