= 9C =

9C or 9c may refer to:

- Spring Airlines, IATA code 9C
- Ninth Cambridge Survey of Radio Sources (9C survey)
- Carbon-9 (^{9}C), an isotope of carbon

== See also ==
- C9 (disambiguation)
