= Cambridge Interferometer =

Radio interferometer

- Location: United Kingdom
- Coordinates: 52°13′N 0°06′E
- Wavelength: 81.5, 159 MHz (3.68, 1.89 m)
- Location within the United Kingdom

The Cambridge Interferometer was a radio telescope interferometer built by Martin Ryle and Antony Hewish in the early 1950s to the west of Cambridge (between the Grange Road football ground and the current Cavendish Laboratory). The interferometer consisted of an array of 4 fixed elements to survey the sky. It produced the two Cambridge catalogues of radio sources (the 2C catalogue of radio sources at 81.5 MHz, and the 3C catalogue of radio sources at 159 MHz, building on the work of the Preliminary survey of the radio stars in the Northern Hemisphere at 45 MHz - 214 MHz using the 2-element Long Michelson Interferometer), discovering some of the most interesting astronomical objects known. The telescope was operated by the Radio Astronomy Group of Cambridge University.

Martin Ryle and Antony Hewish received the Nobel Prize for Physics in 1974 for this and other related work.
