= Tolman surface brightness test =

Cosmological test

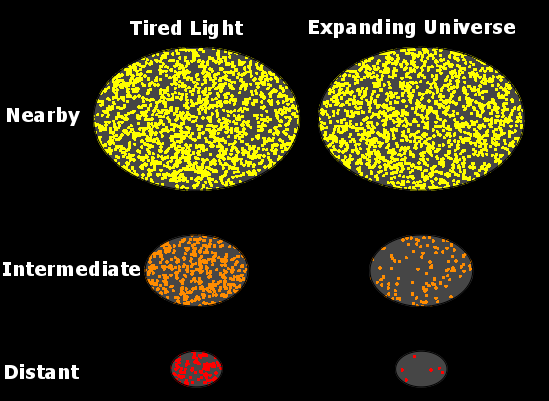
Tired light hypothesis vs. expanding universe

The Tolman surface brightness test is one out of six cosmological tests that were conceived in the 1930s to check the viability of and compare new cosmological models. Tolman's test compares the surface brightness of galaxies as a function of their redshift (measured as z). Such a comparison was first proposed in 1930 by Richard C. Tolman as a test of whether the universe is expanding or static. It is a unique test of cosmology, as it is independent of dark energy, dark matter and Hubble constant parameters, testing purely for whether Cosmological Redshift is caused by an expanding universe or not.

In a simple (static and flat) universe, the light received from an object drops proportional to the square of its distance and the apparent area of the object also drops proportional to the square of the distance, so the surface brightness (light received per surface area) would be constant, independent of the distance. In an expanding universe, however, there are two effects that change this relation. First, the rate at which photons are received is reduced because each photon has to travel a little farther than the one before. Second, the energy of each photon observed is reduced by the redshift. At the same time, distant objects appear larger than they really are because the photons observed were emitted at a time when the object was closer. Adding these effects together, the surface brightness in a simple expanding universe (flat geometry and uniform expansion over the range of redshifts observed) should decrease with the fourth power of 1+z.

One of the earliest and most comprehensive studies was published in 1996, as observational requirements limited the practicality of the test till then. This test found consistency with an expanding universe. However, therein, the authors note that:

"The results of any Tolman SB test where galaxies must be corrected to a standard condition will involve some dependence on the assumed cosmology, but as will be described below, for the redshifts of interest here, the effect of cosmology is quite small compared to the predicted difference between the expansion and tired-light models."

A later paper that reviewed this one removed their assumed expansion cosmology for calculating SB, to make for a fair test, and found that the 1996 results, once the correction was made, did not rule out a static universe.

To date, the most complex investigation of the relationship between surface brightness and redshift was carried out using the 10 m Keck telescope to measure nearly a thousand galaxies' redshifts and the 2.4 m Hubble Space Telescope to measure those galaxies' surface brightness. The exponent found is not 4 as expected in the simplest expanding model, but 2.6 or 3.4, depending on the frequency band. The authors summarize:

"We show that this is precisely the range expected from the evolutionary models of Bruzual & Charlot. We conclude that the Tolman surface brightness test is consistent with the reality of the expansion."

Some proceeding work has pointed out that the analysis tested one possible static cosmology (analogous to Einstein–de Sitter), and that static models with different angular size-distance relationships can pass this test. The predicted difference between static and expansion diverges dramatically towards higher redshifts, however, accounting for galaxy evolution becomes increasingly uncertain. The broadest test done to date was out to z=5, this test found their results to be consistent with a static universe, but was unable to rule out expansion as it tested only a single model of galaxy size evolution. Static tired-light models remain in conflict with observations of supernovae, as these models do not predict cosmological time dilation.

== See also ==
- Source counts
- Tired light
- Time dilation
