= MacMillan (crater) =

Crater on the Moon

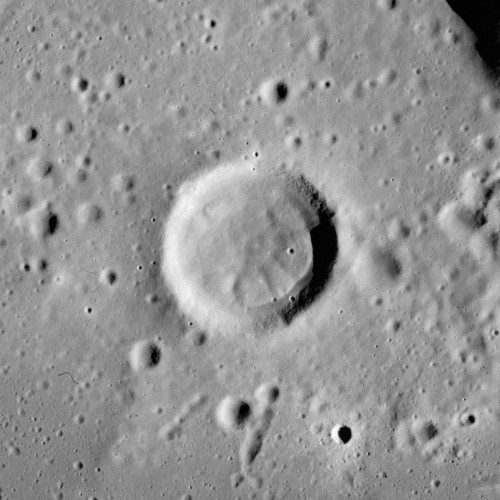
- Apollo 15 mapping camera image
- Coordinates: 24.2°N 7.8°E
- Diameter: 8 km
- Depth: 0.46 km (0.29 mi)
- Colongitude: 8° at sunrise
- Eponym: William D. MacMillan

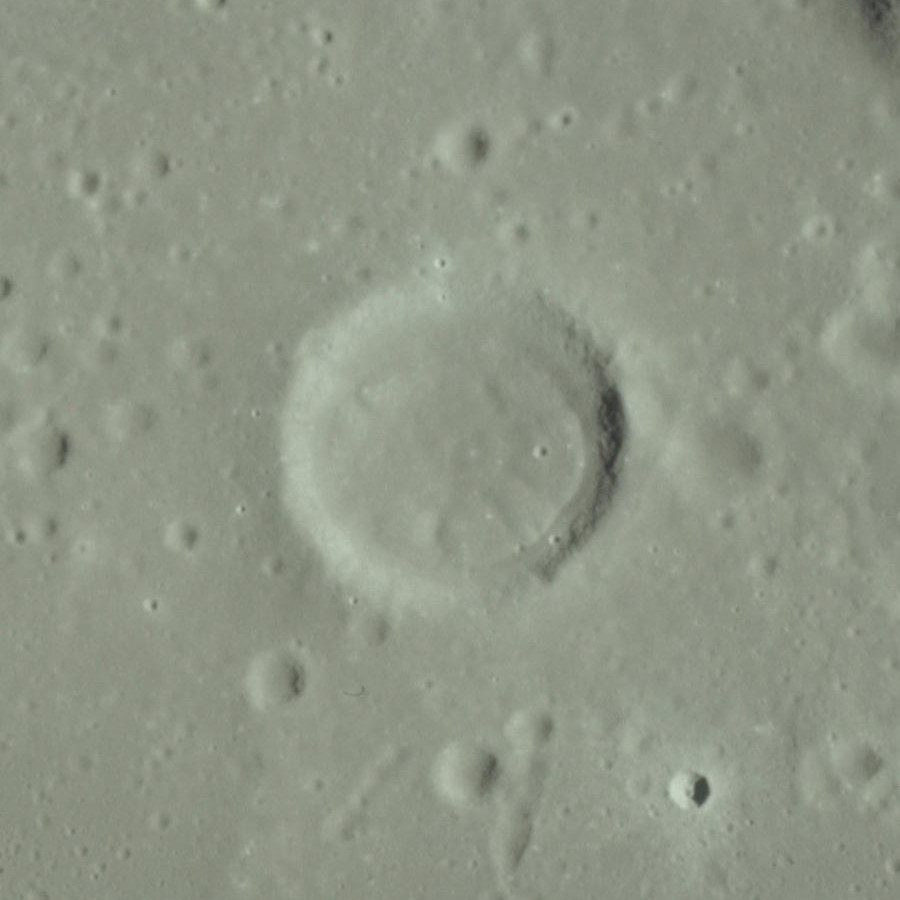
Apollo 17 image

MacMillan is a bowl-shaped lunar impact crater on the eastern fringes of the Mare Imbrium. It was named after American mathematician and astronomer William Duncan MacMillan. It is located just to the southwest of a lone rise, near the southwestern edge of the Montes Archimedes. This is a cup-shaped depression in the surface with an interior albedo that matches the nearby lunar mare. The edges of the rim have a somewhat higher albedo. It shows some indications of a concentric crater.

This crater was previously identified as Archimedes F.
