= C9 =

C9, C09 or C-9 may refer to:

== Biology, medicine, and chemistry ==
- C9 (Complement component 9), a protein
- ATC code C09, a subgroup of the Anatomical Therapeutic Chemical Classification System
- C09, ICD-10 code for malignant neoplasm of tonsil
- Carbon-9 (C-9 or ^{9}C), an isotope of carbon
- Coccinella novemnotata, the nine-spotted ladybug or C9, a species of lady beetle

== Military and weapons ==
- Hi-Point Models C9 and C9 Comp handguns
- C9 LMG, Canadian light machine gun
- C9, an ID for the German Nachtjagdgeschwader 5 air squadron in World War II

== Music ==
- C9, a note five octaves above Middle C
- C9, a C ninth chord

== Organizations ==
- Cloud9, an American esports organization
- C9 League, an association of Chinese universities
- The Council of Cardinal Advisers, an advisory body to the pope, originally comprising nine members
- C9 Entertainment, a South Korean entertainment company and record label

== Transportation ==
- Cierva C.9, a 1927 British experimental autogyro
- HMS C9, a British submarine
- Ford C-9, a US military designation for the Ford Trimotor aircraft
- McDonnell Douglas C-9, a US Air Force transport aircraft based on the civilian DC-9
- USS Montgomery (C-9), a US Navy cruiser
- C9, the IATA code for Cirrus Airlines
- Sauber C9, a Le Mans racing car
- C9 engine, by Caterpillar Inc.
- C-9 (Cercanías Madrid), a commuter rail line in Madrid
- LNER Class C9, a class of 2 British steam locomotives rebuilt from C7s in 1931
- SL C9, a type of rolling stock used in the Stockholm metro
- Omoda C9, a Chinese mid-size crossover SUV

== Other uses ==
- C9, an ISO 216 standard paper size
- C9, a holiday light bulb size
- C9, a sportswear line by Champion

== See also ==
- 9C (disambiguation)
