= Source counts =

The source counts distribution of radio-sources from a radio-astronomical survey is the cumulative distribution of the number of sources (N) brighter than a given flux density (S). As it is usually plotted on a log-log scale its distribution is known as the log N – log S plot. It is one of several cosmological tests that were conceived in the 1930s to check the viability of and compare new cosmological models.

Early work to catalogue radio sources aimed to determine the source count distribution as a discriminating test of different cosmological models. For example, a uniform distribution of radio sources at low redshift, such as might be found in a 'steady-state Euclidean universe,' would produce a slope of −1.5 in the cumulative distribution of log(N) versus log(S).

Data from the early Cambridge 2C survey (published 1955) apparently implied a (log(N), log(S)) slope of nearly −3.0. This appeared to invalidate the steady state theory of Fred Hoyle, Hermann Bondi and Thomas Gold. Unfortunately many of these weaker sources were subsequently found to be due to 'confusion' (the blending of several weak sources in the side-lobes of the interferometer, producing a stronger response).

By contrast, analysis from the contemporaneous Mills Cross data (by Slee and Mills) were consistent with an index of −1.5.

Later and more accurate surveys from Cambridge, 3C, 3CR, and 4C, also showed source count slopes steeper than −1.5, though by a smaller margin than 2C. This convinced some cosmologists that the steady state theory was wrong, although residual problems with confusion provided some defense for Hoyle and his colleagues.

The immediate interest in testing the steady-state theory through source-counts was reduced by the discovery of the 3K microwave background radiation in the mid-1960s, which essentially confirmed the Big-Bang model.

Later radio survey data have shown a complex picture — the 3C and 4C claims appear to hold up, while at fainter levels the source counts flatten substantially below a slope of −1.5. This is now understood to reflect the effects of both density and luminosity evolution of the principal radio sources over cosmic timescales.

== See also ==
- Tolman surface brightness test
