= Big Bang =

Physical theory of the cosmos

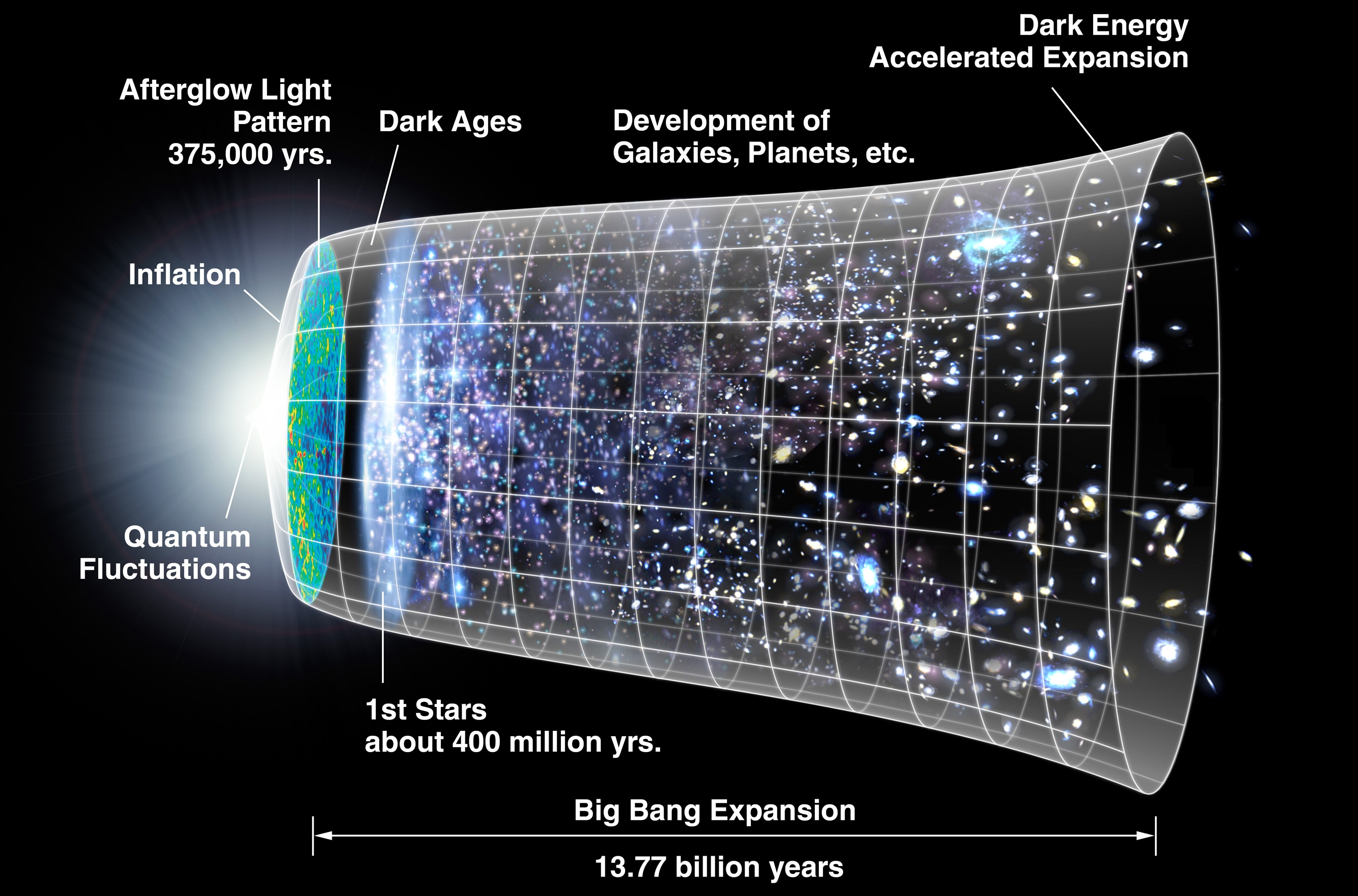
Timeline of the expansion of the universe, where space is represented schematically at each time by circular sections. On the left, the dramatic expansion of inflation; at the center, the expansion accelerates (artist's concept; neither time nor size are to scale).

The Big Bang is a physical theory that describes how the universe expanded from an early state of high density and temperature. Various cosmological models based on the Big Bang concept explain a broad range of phenomena, including the abundance of light elements, the cosmic microwave background (CMB) radiation, the redshift of galaxies and the large-scale structure of the universe. The observed uniformity of the universe, which leads to the horizon and flatness problems, is explained through cosmic inflation: a phase of accelerated expansion during the earliest stages. Detailed measurements of the expansion rate of the universe place the cosmic inflation at an estimated 13.787±0.02 billion years ago, which is considered the age of the universe. A wide range of empirical evidence strongly favors the Big Bang model, which is now widely accepted.

Extrapolating this cosmic expansion backward in time using the known laws of physics, the models describe an extraordinarily hot and dense primordial universe. The original Big Bang model extrapolated the universe back towards a Big Bang singularity. However, the modern view incorporates inflationary cosmology, whereby the universe emerged out of inflation in a supercooled state. This was followed by a reheating event that converted the energy that drove inflation into a hot and dense plasma, initiating the hot Big Bang. As the universe expanded, it cooled sufficiently to allow the formation of subatomic particles, and later atoms. These primordial elements—mostly hydrogen, with some helium and lithium—then coalesced under the force of gravity aided by dark matter, forming early stars and galaxies. Measurements of the redshifts of supernovae indicate that the expansion of the universe is accelerating, an observation attributed to a concept called dark energy.

The concept of an expanding universe was introduced by the physicist Alexander Friedmann in 1922 with the mathematical derivation of the Friedmann equations. The earliest empirical observation of an expanding universe is known as Hubble's law, published in work by physicist Edwin Hubble in 1929, which discerned that galaxies are moving away from Earth at a rate that accelerates proportionally with distance. Independent of Friedmann's work, and independent of Hubble's observations, in 1931 physicist Georges Lemaître proposed that the universe emerged from a "primeval atom", introducing the modern notion of the Big Bang. In 1964, the CMB was accidentally discovered. Over the next few years measurements showed this radiation to be uniform over directions in the sky and the shape of the energy versus intensity curve, both consistent with the Big Bang models of high temperatures and densities in the distant past. By the late 1960s most cosmologists were convinced that the competing steady-state model of cosmic evolution was incorrect.

There remain aspects of the observed universe that are not yet adequately explained by the Big Bang models. These include the unequal abundances of matter and antimatter known as baryon asymmetry, the detailed nature of dark matter surrounding galaxies, and the origin of dark energy.

== Features of the models ==
=== Assumptions ===
Big Bang cosmology models depend on three major assumptions: the universality of physical laws, the cosmological principle, and that the matter content can be modeled as a perfect fluid. The universality of physical laws is one of the underlying principles of the theory of relativity. The cosmological principle states that on large scales the universe is homogeneous and isotropic—appearing the same in all directions regardless of location. A perfect fluid has no viscosity; the pressure of a perfect fluid is proportional to its density.

These ideas were initially taken as postulates, but later efforts were made to test each of them. For example, the first assumption has been tested by observations showing that the largest possible deviation of the fine-structure constant over much of the age of the universe is of order 10^{−5}. The key physical law behind these models, general relativity has passed stringent tests on the scale of the Solar System and binary stars. The cosmological principle has been confirmed to a level of 10^{−5} via observations of the temperature of the CMB. At the scale of the CMB horizon, the universe has been measured to be homogeneous with an upper bound on the order of 10% inhomogeneity, as of 1995.

=== Expansion prediction ===
The cosmological principle dramatically simplifies the equations of general relativity, giving the Friedmann–Lemaître–Robertson–Walker metric to describe the geometry of the universe and, with the assumption of a perfect fluid, the Friedmann equations giving the time dependence of that geometry. The only parameter at this level of description is the mass-energy density: the geometry of the universe and its expansion is a direct consequence of its density. All of the major features of Big Bang cosmology are related to these results.

=== Mass-energy density ===
Estimated relative distribution for components of the energy density of the universe. (In February 2015, the European-led research team behind the Planck cosmology probe released new data refining these values to 4.9% ordinary matter, 25.9% dark matter and 69.1% dark energy.)

In Big Bang cosmology, the mass–energy density controls the shape and evolution of the universe. By combining astronomical observations with known laws of thermodynamics and particle physics, cosmologists have worked out the components of the density over the lifespan of the universe. In the current universe, luminous matter, the stars, planets, and so on makes up less than 5% of the density. Dark matter accounts for 27% and dark energy the remaining 68%.

=== Horizons ===
An important feature of the Big Bang spacetime is the presence of particle horizons. Since the universe has a finite age, and light travels at a finite speed, there may be events in the past whose light has not yet had time to reach earth. This places a limit or a past horizon on the most distant objects that can be observed. Conversely, because space is expanding, and more distant objects are receding ever more quickly, light emitted today may never "catch up" to very distant objects. This defines a future horizon, which limits the events in the future that we will be able to influence. The presence of either type of horizon depends on the details of the Friedmann–Lemaître–Robertson–Walker (FLRW) metric that describes the expansion of the universe.

The understanding of the universe back to very early times suggests that there is a past horizon, though in practice an observer's view is also limited by the opacity of the universe at early times. Therefore, that view cannot extend further backward in time, though the horizon recedes in space. If the expansion of the universe continues to accelerate, there is a future horizon as well.

=== Thermalization ===
Some processes in the early universe occurred too slowly, compared to the expansion rate of the universe, to reach approximate thermodynamic equilibrium. Others were fast enough to reach thermalization. The parameter usually used to find out whether a process in the very early universe has reached thermal equilibrium is the ratio between the rate of the process (usually rate of collisions between particles) and the Hubble parameter. The larger the ratio, the more time particles had to thermalize before they were too far away from each other.

== Timeline ==
Big Bang models propose a universe that has been expanding and cooling from a very hot and very compact state. Modern theories are based on a brief preceding era of inflation.

=== Inflation ===
Cosmological inflation is an extremely brief period of time, a billion, trillion times shorter than a trillionth of a second, during which the universe doubled in size more than 80 times. Inflation seeded what would later become the large-scale structure of the universe from microscopic quantum fluctuations that were "frozen in" during inflation.

Inflation supercooled the universe to a negligible temperature and density. Any particles that may have been present before inflation began would have been diluted to extremely low concentrations. After inflation ended, the universe underwent a period of reheating, which transferred the energy that was responsible for inflation into a hot and dense thermal plasma of primarily Standard Model particles. The exact mechanism that drove reheating is unknown, but many models have been put forward. It is also unknown what the temperature after reheating was, although it must have been between 10^{11} and 10^{29} K.

=== Hot Big Bang ===
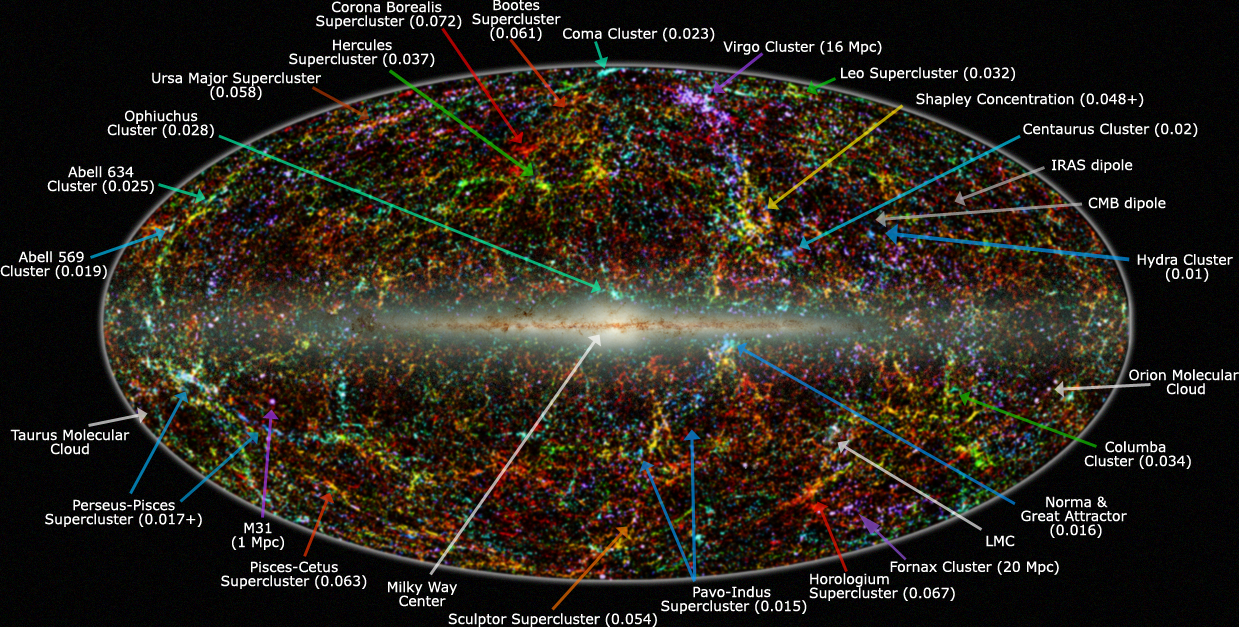
Panoramic view of the entire near-infrared sky reveals the distribution of galaxies beyond the Milky Way. Galaxies are color-coded by redshift.

After reheating temperatures were so high that the random motions of particles were at relativistic speeds, and particle–antiparticle pairs of all kinds were being continuously created and destroyed in collisions. At some point, an unknown reaction called baryogenesis violated the conservation of baryon number, leading to a very small excess of quarks and leptons over antiquarks and antileptons—of the order of one part in 30 million. This resulted in the predominance of matter over antimatter in the present universe.

The universe continued to decrease in density and fall in temperature, hence the typical energy of each particle was decreasing. Symmetry-breaking phase transitions put the fundamental forces of physics and the parameters of elementary particles into their present form, with the electromagnetic force and weak nuclear force separating at about 10^{−12} seconds.

After about 10^{−11} seconds, the picture becomes less speculative, since particle energies drop to values that can be attained in particle accelerators. At about 10^{−6} seconds, quarks and gluons combined to form baryons such as protons and neutrons. The small excess of quarks over antiquarks led to a small excess of baryons over antibaryons. The temperature was no longer high enough to create either new proton–antiproton or neutron–antineutron pairs. A mass annihilation immediately followed, leaving just one in 10^{8} of the original matter particles and none of their antiparticles. A similar process happened at about 1 second for electrons and positrons. After these annihilations, the remaining protons, neutrons and electrons were no longer moving relativistically and the energy density of the universe was dominated by photons (with a minor contribution from neutrinos).

A few minutes into the expansion, when the temperature was about a billion kelvin and the density of matter in the universe was comparable to the current density of Earth's atmosphere, neutrons combined with protons to form the universe's deuterium and helium nuclei in a process called Big Bang nucleosynthesis (BBN). Most protons remained uncombined as hydrogen nuclei.

As the universe cooled, the rest energy density of matter came to gravitationally dominate over that of the photon and neutrino radiation at a time of about 50,000 years. At a time of about 380,000 years, the universe cooled enough that electrons and nuclei combined into neutral atoms (mostly hydrogen) in an event called recombination. This process made the previously opaque universe transparent, and the photons that last scattered during this epoch comprise the cosmic microwave background.

=== Structure formation ===
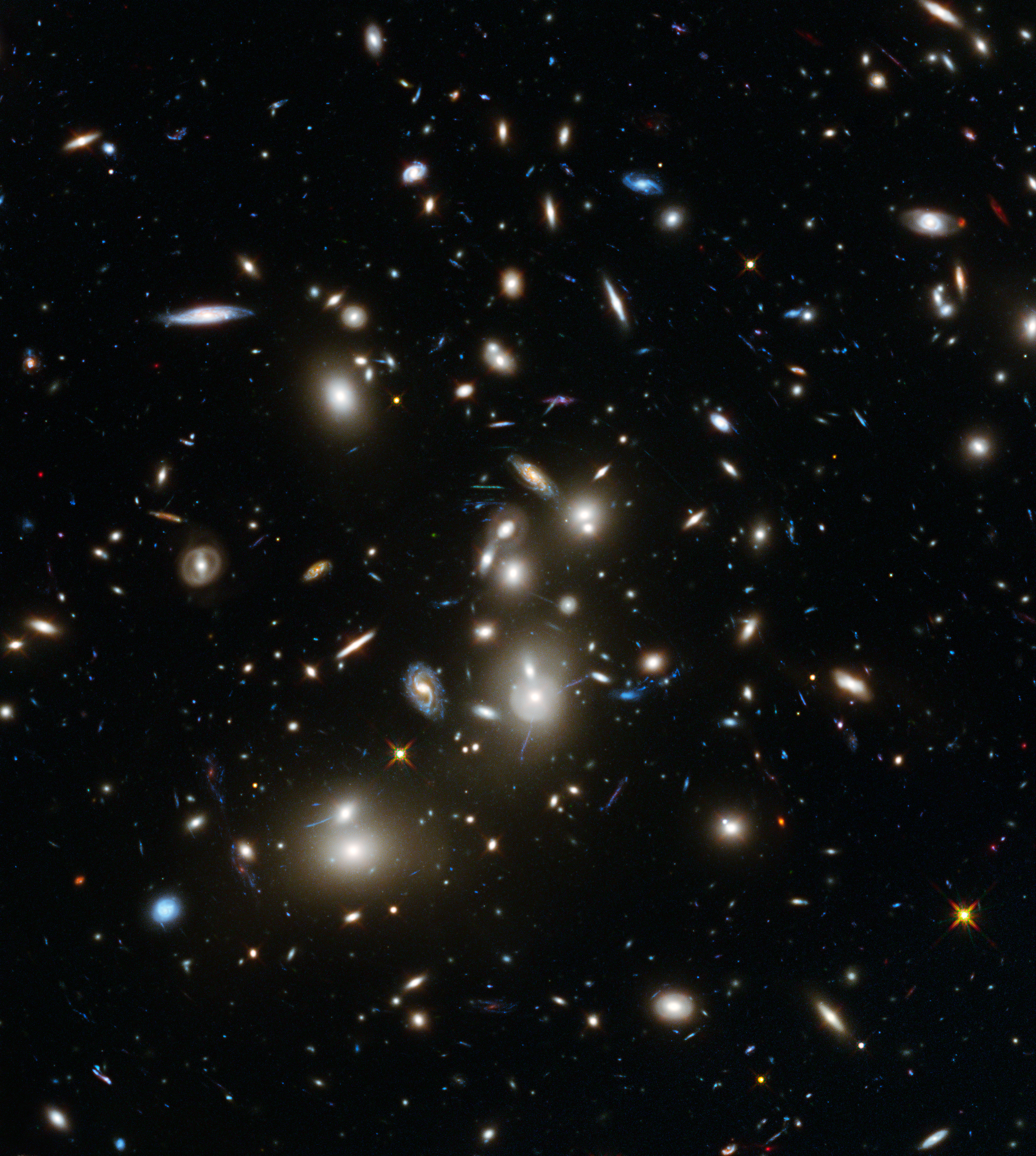
Abell 2744 galaxy cluster – Hubble Frontier Fields view

After the recombination epoch, the slightly denser regions of the uniformly distributed matter gravitationally attracted nearby matter and thus grew even denser, forming gas clouds, stars, galaxies, and the other astronomical structures observable today. The details of this process depend on the amount and type of matter in the universe. The four possible types of matter are known as cold dark matter (CDM), warm dark matter, hot dark matter, and baryonic matter. The best measurements available, from the Wilkinson Microwave Anisotropy Probe (WMAP), show that the data is well-fit by a Lambda-CDM model in which dark matter is assumed to be cold. This CDM is estimated to make up about 23% of the matter/energy of the universe, while baryonic matter makes up about 4.6%.

=== Cosmic acceleration ===
Independent lines of evidence from Type Ia supernovae and the CMB imply that the universe today is dominated by a mysterious form of energy known as dark energy, which appears to homogeneously permeate all of space. Observations suggest that 73% of the total energy density of the present day universe is in this form. When the universe was very young it was likely infused with dark energy, but with everything closer together, gravity predominated, braking the expansion. Eventually, after billions of years of expansion, the declining density of matter relative to the density of dark energy allowed the expansion of the universe to begin to accelerate.

Dark energy in its simplest formulation is modeled by a cosmological constant term in Einstein field equations of general relativity, but its composition and mechanism are unknown. More generally, the details of its equation of state and relationship with the Standard Model of particle physics continue to be investigated both through observation and theory.

All of this cosmic evolution after the inflationary epoch can be rigorously described and modeled by the lambda-CDM model of cosmology, which uses the independent frameworks of quantum mechanics and general relativity. There are no easily testable models that would describe the situation prior to approximately 10^{−15} seconds. Understanding this earliest of eras in the history of the universe is one of the greatest unsolved problems in physics.

== Concept history ==
=== Etymology ===
The term Big Bang did not catch on until the 1970s. Astronomer Fred Hoyle is credited with coining the term in a March 1949 BBC Third Programme broadcast, contrasting it with his own steady-state model:

One of them is distinguished by the assumption that the universe started its life a finite time ago in a single huge explosion. On this supposition, the present expansion is a relic of the violence of the explosion Now this Big Bang idea seemed to me to be unsatisfactory... On scientific grounds, too, I cannot see any grounds for preferring the Big Bang idea.

It is popularly reported that Hoyle, who favored the steady state, intended this to be pejorative, but Hoyle explicitly denied this and said it was just a striking image meant to highlight the difference between the two models. (Note: Hoyle stated: "I was constantly striving over the radio – where I had no visual aids, nothing except the spoken word – for visual images. And that seemed to be one way of distinguishing between the steady-state and the explosive big bang. And so that was the language I used.") Helge Kragh writes that the evidence for the claim that it was meant as a pejorative is "unconvincing", and mentions a number of indications that it was not a pejorative.

A primordial singularity is sometimes called "the Big Bang", but the term can also refer to a more generic early hot, dense phase. The term itself has been argued to be a misnomer because it evokes an explosion. The argument is that whereas an explosion suggests expansion into a surrounding space, the Big Bang only describes the intrinsic expansion of the contents of the universe. Another issue pointed out by Santhosh Mathew is that bang implies sound, which is not an important feature of the model. However, when Sky and Telescope ran a competition in 1993 to find a more suitable alternative no alternative was successful.

=== Before the name ===
Hubble eXtreme Deep Field (XDF)

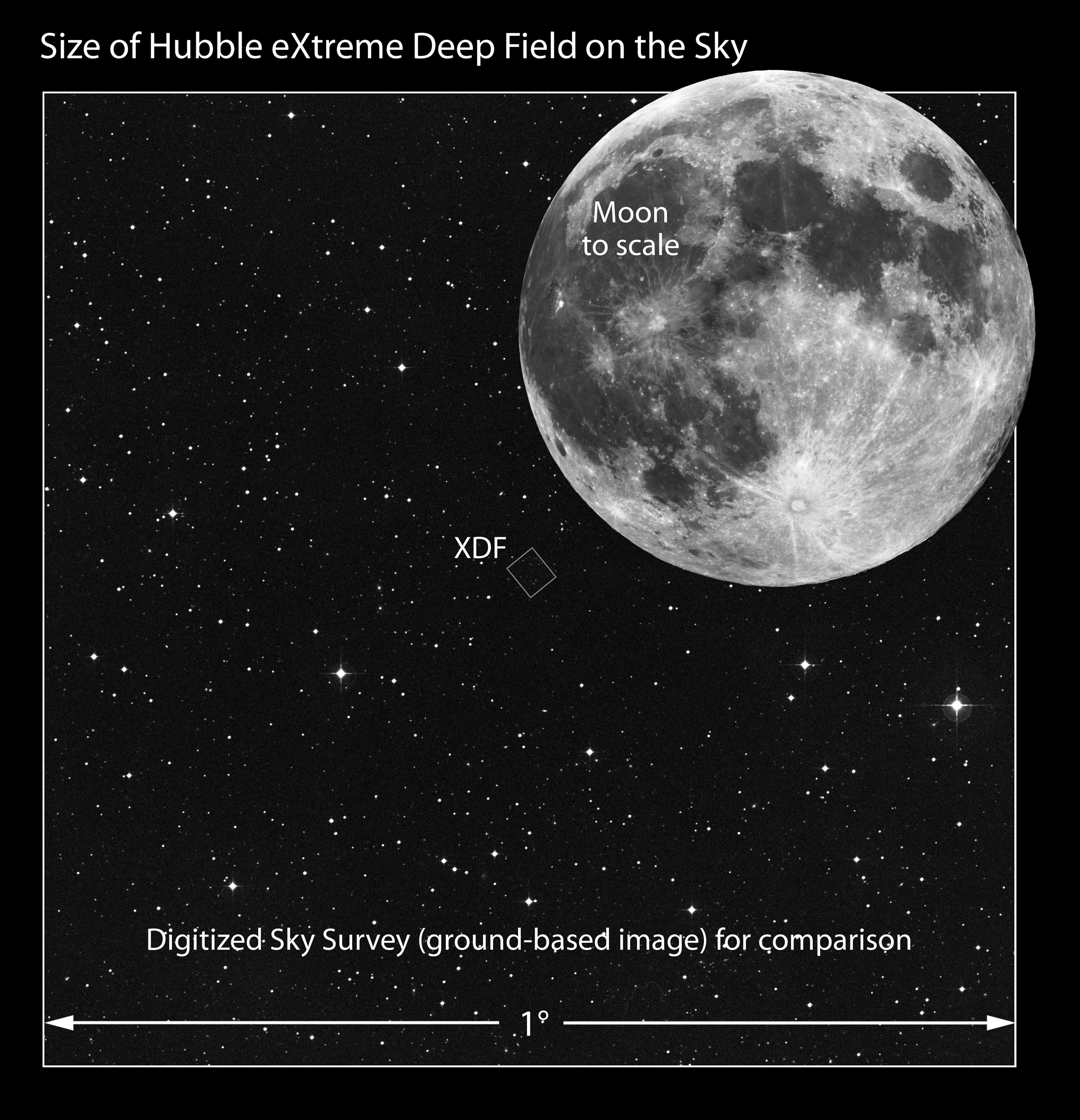
XDF size compared to the size of the Moon (XDF is the small box to the left of, and nearly below, the Moon) – several thousand galaxies, each consisting of billions of stars, are in this small view.

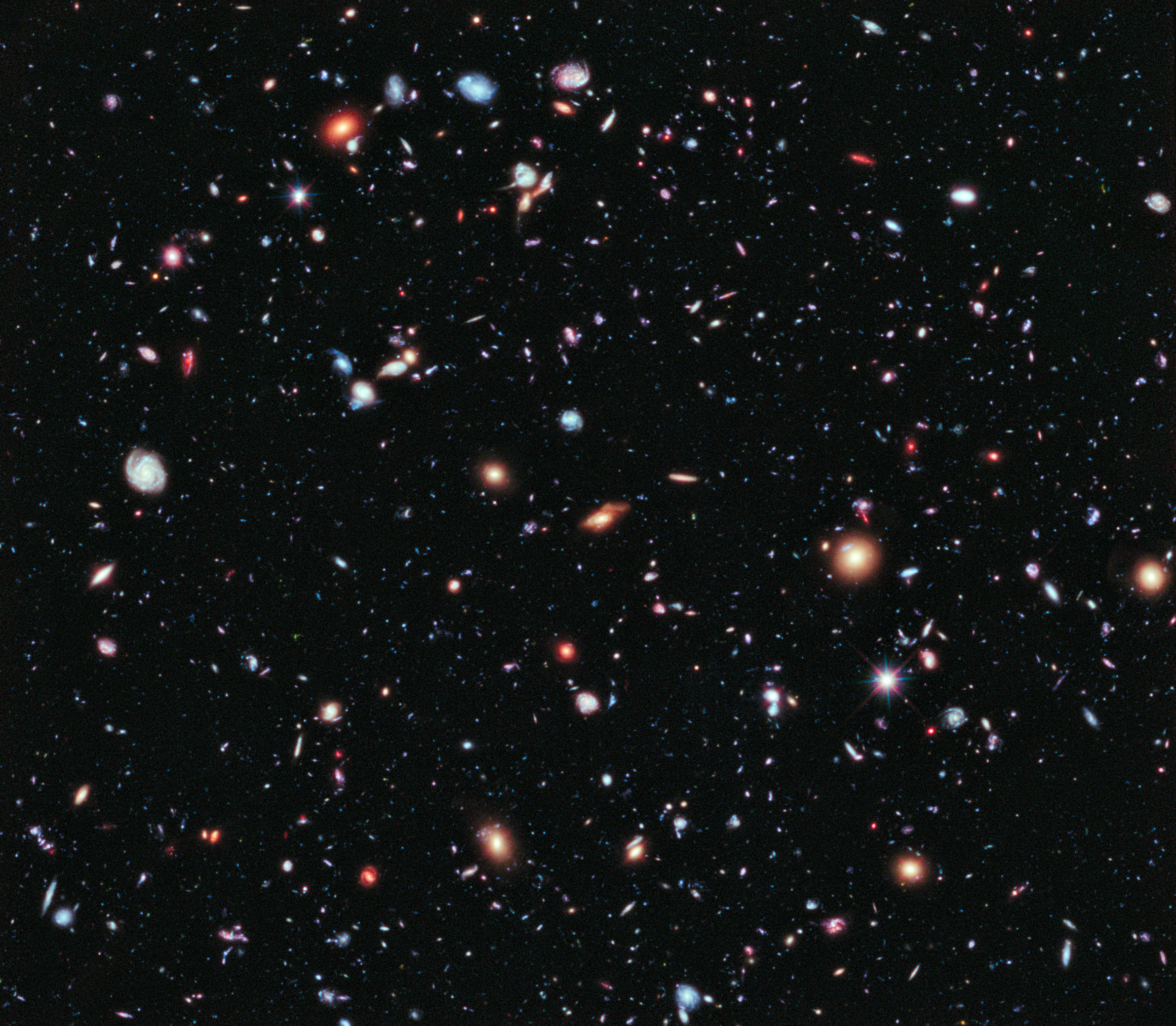
XDF (2012) view – each light speck is a galaxy – some of these are as old as 13.2 billion years – the universe is estimated to contain 200 billion galaxies.

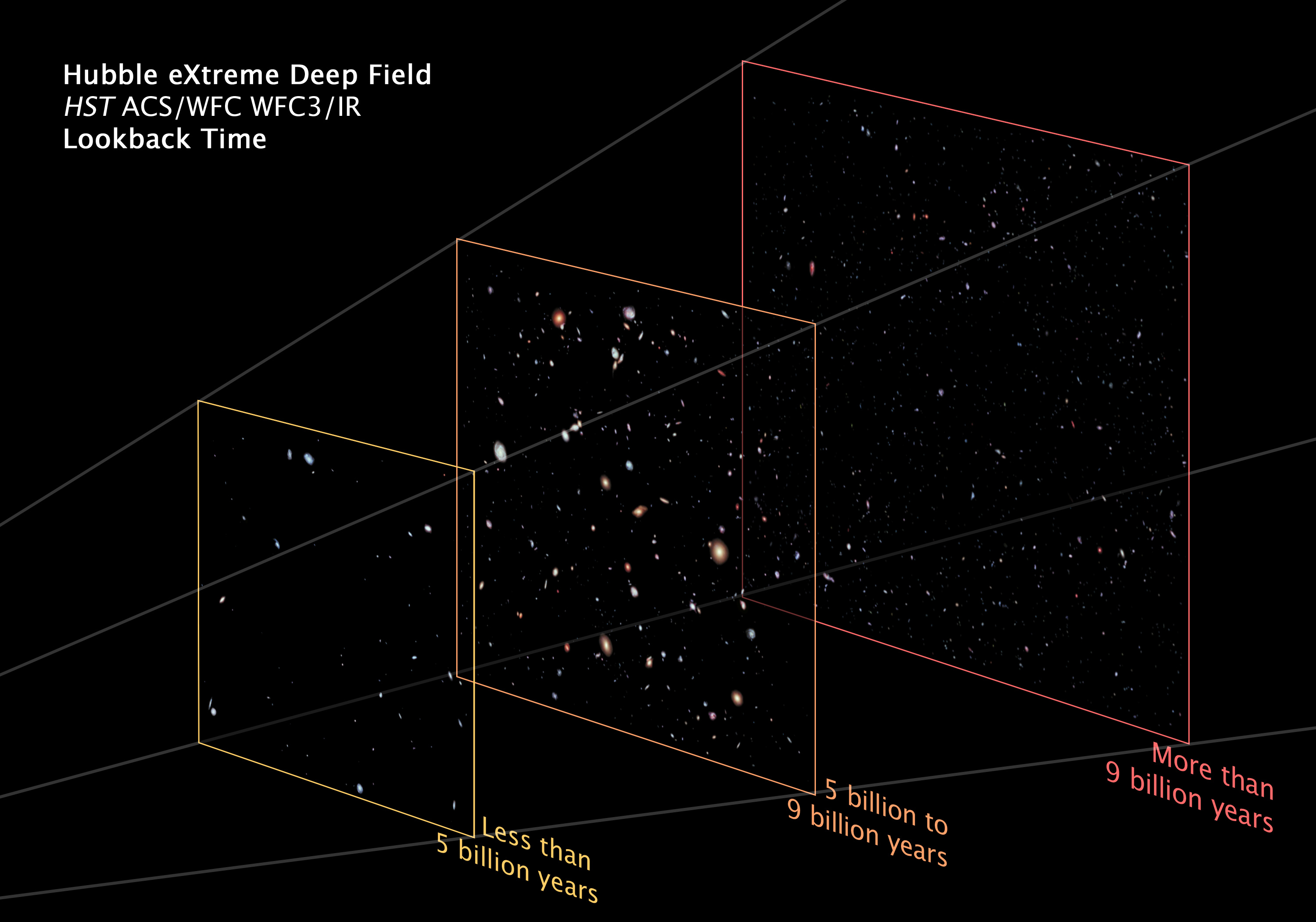
XDF image shows fully mature galaxies in the foreground plane – nearly mature galaxies from 5 to 9 billion years ago – protogalaxies, blazing with young stars, beyond 9 billion years.

Early cosmological models developed from observations of the structure of the universe and from theoretical considerations. In 1912, Vesto Slipher measured the first Doppler shift of a "spiral nebula" (spiral nebula is the obsolete term for spiral galaxies), and soon discovered that almost all such nebulae were receding from Earth. He did not grasp the cosmological implications of this fact, and indeed at the time it was highly controversial whether or not these nebulae were "island universes" outside the Milky Way. Ten years later, Alexander Friedmann, a Russian cosmologist and mathematician, derived the Friedmann equations from the Einstein field equations, showing that the universe might be expanding in contrast to the static universe model advocated by Albert Einstein at that time.

In 1924, American astronomer Edwin Hubble's measurement of the great distance to the nearest spiral nebulae showed that these systems were indeed other galaxies. Starting that same year, Hubble painstakingly developed a series of distance indicators, the forerunner of the cosmic distance ladder, using the 100-inch (2.5 m) Hooker telescope at Mount Wilson Observatory. This allowed him to estimate distances to galaxies whose redshifts had already been measured, mostly by Slipher. In 1929, Hubble, with the help of Milton Humason, discovered a correlation between distance and recessional velocity—now known as Hubble's law.

Independently deriving Friedmann's equations in 1927, Georges Lemaître, a Belgian physicist and Roman Catholic priest, proposed that the recession of the nebulae was due to the expansion of the universe. He inferred the relation that Hubble would later observe, given the cosmological principle. In 1931, Lemaître went further and suggested that the evident expansion of the universe, if projected back in time, meant that the further in the past the smaller the universe was, until at some finite time in the past all the mass of the universe was concentrated into a single point, a "primeval atom" where and when the fabric of time and space came into existence.

In the 1920s and 1930s, almost every major cosmologist preferred an eternal steady-state universe, and several complained that the beginning of time implied by an expanding universe imported religious concepts into physics; this objection was later repeated by supporters of the steady-state theory. This perception was enhanced by the fact that the originator of the expanding universe concept, Lemaître, was a Roman Catholic priest. Arthur Eddington agreed with Aristotle that the universe did not have a beginning in time, viz., that matter is eternal. A beginning in time was "repugnant" to him. Lemaître, however, disagreed:

If the world has begun with a single quantum, the notions of space and time would altogether fail to have any meaning at the beginning; they would only begin to have a sensible meaning when the original quantum had been divided into a sufficient number of quanta. If this suggestion is correct, the beginning of the world happened a little before the beginning of space and time.

During the 1930s, other ideas were proposed as non-standard cosmologies to explain Hubble's observations, including the Milne model, the oscillatory universe (originally suggested by Friedmann, but advocated by Albert Einstein and Richard C. Tolman) and Fritz Zwicky's tired light hypothesis.

After World War II, two distinct possibilities emerged. One was Fred Hoyle's steady-state model, whereby new matter would be created as the universe seemed to expand. In this model the universe is roughly the same at any point in time. The other was Lemaître's expanding universe theory, advocated and developed by George Gamow, who used it to develop a theory for the abundance of chemical elements in the universe. and whose associates, Ralph Alpher and Robert Herman, predicted the cosmic background radiation.

=== As a named model ===
Ironically, it was Hoyle who coined the phrase that came to be applied to Lemaître's theory, referring to it as "this big bang idea" during a BBC Radio broadcast in March 1949. (Note: It is commonly reported that Hoyle intended this to be pejorative. However, Hoyle later denied that, saying that it was just a striking image meant to emphasize the difference between the two theories for radio listeners.) For a while, support was split between these two theories. Eventually, the observational evidence, most notably from radio source counts, began to favor Big Bang over steady state. The discovery and confirmation of the CMB in 1964 secured the Big Bang as the best theory of the origin and evolution of the universe.

In 1968 and 1970, Roger Penrose, Stephen Hawking, and George F. R. Ellis published papers where they showed that mathematical singularities were an inevitable initial condition of relativistic models of the Big Bang. Then, from the 1970s to the 1990s, cosmologists worked on characterizing the features of the Big Bang universe and resolving outstanding problems. In 1981, Alan Guth made a breakthrough in theoretical work on resolving certain outstanding theoretical problems in the Big Bang models with the introduction of an epoch of rapid expansion in the early universe he called "inflation". Meanwhile, during these decades, two questions in observational cosmology that generated much discussion and disagreement were over the precise values of the Hubble Constant and the matter-density of the universe (before the discovery of dark energy, thought to be the key predictor for the eventual fate of the universe).

=== Pre-inflationary Big Bang model ===
Before the development of inflationary cosmology, the Big Bang model was extrapolated backwards in time to a Big Bang singularity. It was then followed by the Planck epoch, where the universe was extremely hot and dense, with a temperature close to the Planck scale (around 10^{32} K or 10^{28} eV). The Planck epoch lasted until 10^{−43} seconds into the expansion during which all four forces, the strong, weak, electromagnetic, and graviational, may have been unified into a single force. Even the very concept of a particle breaks down in these conditions. A proper understanding of this period awaits the development of a theory of quantum gravity. The initial singularity may be absent in a theory of quantum gravity; it arises from an extrapolation of general relativity.

The Planck epoch may have been succeeded by the Grand Unification epoch, where gravitation separated from the other forces as the universe's temperature fell.

=== Inflationary cosmology ===
The development of inflationary cosmology modified the above view of the Big Bang in its earliest stages. The concept of inflation is motivated by the many problems that arise in the old model. For example, flatness problem asks why the density of matter and energy is very close to the critical density needed to produce a flat universe. That is, the shape of the universe has no overall geometric curvature due to gravitational influence. Additionally, inflationary cosmology also seeds what would later become the large-scale structure of the universe from microscopic quantum fluctuations that were "frozen in" during inflation.

Significant progress in Big Bang cosmology has been made since the late 1990s as a result of advances in telescope technology as well as the analysis of data from satellites such as the Cosmic Background Explorer (COBE), the Hubble Space Telescope and WMAP. Cosmologists now have fairly precise and accurate measurements of many of the parameters of the Big Bang model, and have made the unexpected discovery that the expansion of the universe appears to be accelerating.

== Observational evidence ==
The Big Bang models offer a comprehensive explanation for a broad range of observed phenomena, including the abundances of the light elements, the cosmic microwave background, large-scale structure, and Hubble's law. The earliest and most direct observational evidence of the validity of the theory are the expansion of the universe according to Hubble's law (as indicated by the redshifts of galaxies), discovery and measurement of the cosmic microwave background and the relative abundances of light elements produced by Big Bang nucleosynthesis (BBN). More recent evidence includes observations of galaxy formation and evolution, and the distribution of large-scale cosmic structures. These are sometimes called the "four pillars" of the Big Bang models.

Precise modern models of the Big Bang appeal to various exotic physical phenomena that have not been observed in terrestrial laboratory experiments or incorporated into the Standard Model of particle physics. Of these features, dark matter is currently the subject of most active laboratory investigations. Remaining issues include the cuspy halo problem and the dwarf galaxy problem of cold dark matter. Dark energy is also an area of intense interest for scientists, but it is not clear whether direct detection of dark energy will be possible. Baryogenesis and the origin of dark matter remain more speculative features of current Big Bang models. Viable, quantitative explanations for such phenomena are still being sought. These are unsolved problems in physics.

=== Hubble's law and the expansion of the universe ===
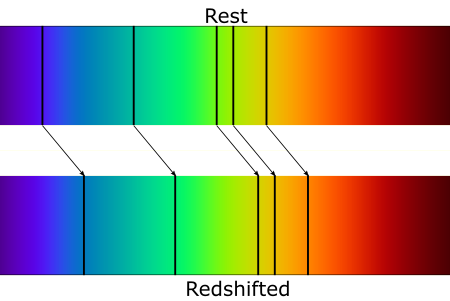
Redshift of absorption lines due to recessional velocity

Observations of distant galaxies and quasars show that these objects are redshifted: the light emitted from them has been shifted to longer wavelengths. This can be seen by taking a frequency spectrum of an object and matching the spectroscopic pattern of emission or absorption lines corresponding to atoms of the chemical elements interacting with the light. These redshifts are uniformly isotropic, distributed evenly among the observed objects in all directions. If the redshift is interpreted as a Doppler shift, the recessional velocity of the object can be calculated. For some galaxies, it is possible to estimate distances via the cosmic distance ladder. When the recessional velocities are plotted against these distances, a linear relationship known as Hubble's law is observed: $v = H_0D$ where

- $v$ is the recessional velocity of the galaxy or other distant object,
- $D$ is the proper distance to the object, and
- $H_0$ is Hubble's constant, measured to be 70.4+1.3
  −1.4 km/s/Mpc by the WMAP.

Hubble's law implies that the universe is uniformly expanding everywhere. This cosmic expansion was predicted from general relativity by Friedmann in 1922 and Lemaître in 1927, well before Hubble made his 1929 analysis and observations, and it remains the cornerstone of the Big Bang model as developed by Friedmann, Lemaître, Robertson, and Walker.

The theory requires the relation $v = HD$ to hold at all times, where $D$ is the proper distance, $v$ is the recessional velocity, and $v$, $H$, and $D$ vary as the universe expands (hence we write $H_0$ to denote the present-day Hubble "constant"). For distances much smaller than the size of the observable universe, the Hubble redshift can be thought of as the Doppler shift corresponding to the recession velocity $v$. For distances comparable to the size of the observable universe, the attribution of the cosmological redshift becomes more ambiguous, although its interpretation as a kinematic Doppler shift remains the most natural one.

An unexplained discrepancy between alternative determinations of the Hubble constant is known as Hubble tension. Techniques based on observation of the CMB suggest a lower value of this constant compared to the quantity derived from measurements based on the cosmic distance ladder.

=== Cosmic microwave background radiation ===
The cosmic microwave background spectrum measured by the FIRAS instrument on the COBE satellite is the most-precisely measured blackbody spectrum in nature. The data points and error bars on this graph are obscured by the theoretical curve.

In 1964, Arno Penzias and Robert Wilson serendipitously discovered the cosmic background radiation, an omnidirectional signal in the microwave band. Their discovery provided substantial confirmation of the big-bang predictions by Alpher, Herman and Gamow around 1950. Through the 1970s, the radiation was found to be approximately consistent with a blackbody spectrum in all directions; this spectrum has been redshifted by the expansion of the universe, and today corresponds to approximately 2.725 K. This tipped the balance of evidence in favor of the Big Bang model, and Penzias and Wilson were awarded the 1978 Nobel Prize in Physics.

The surface of last scattering corresponding to emission of the CMB occurs shortly after recombination, the epoch when neutral hydrogen becomes stable. Prior to this, the universe comprised a hot dense photon-baryon plasma sea where photons were quickly scattered from free charged particles. Peaking at around 372±14 kyr, the mean free path for a photon becomes long enough to reach the present day and the universe becomes transparent.

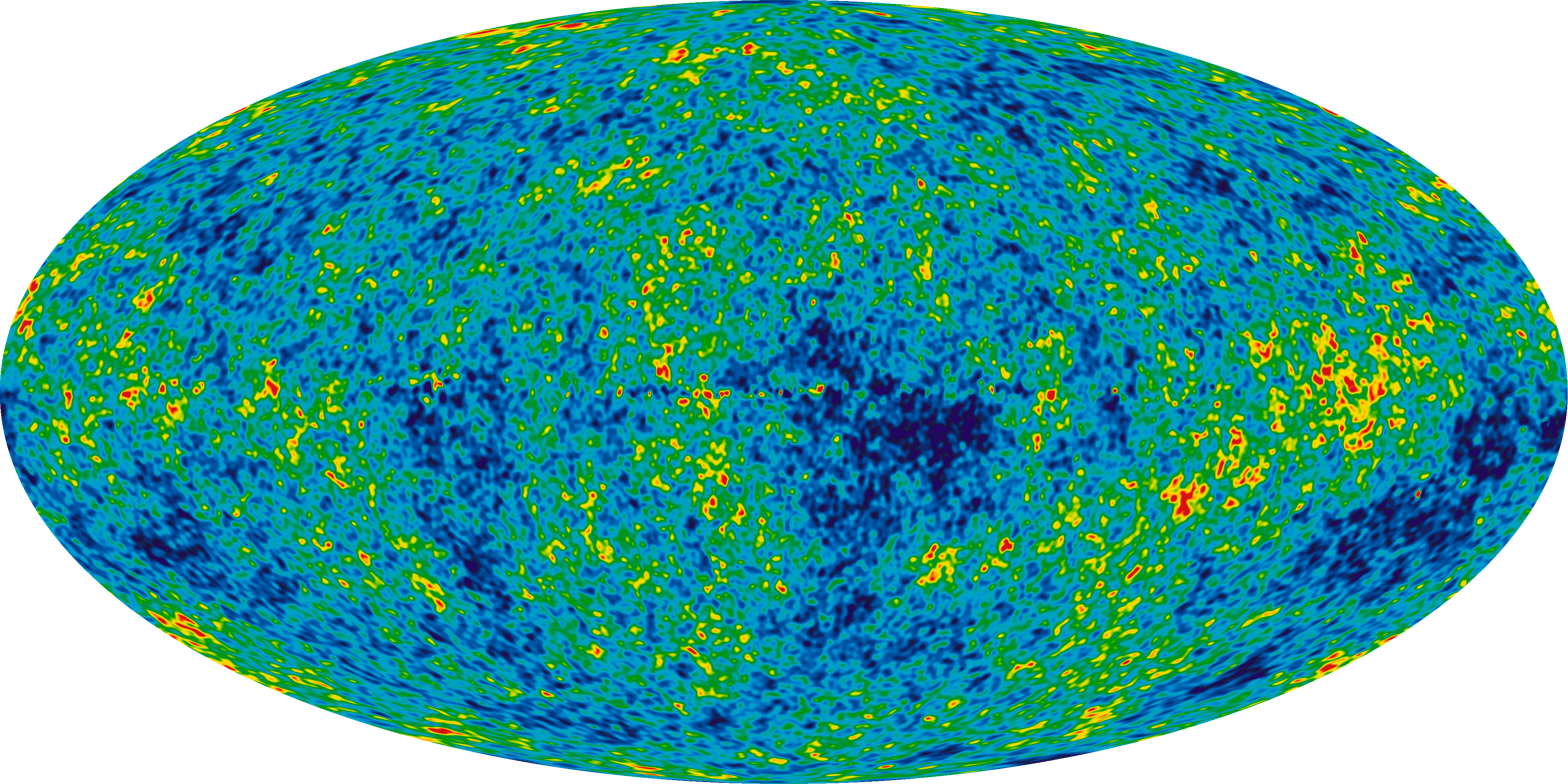
9 year WMAP image of the cosmic microwave background radiation (2012). The radiation is isotropic to roughly one part in 100,000.

In 1989, NASA launched COBE, which made two major advances: in 1990, high-precision spectrum measurements showed that the CMB frequency spectrum is an almost perfect blackbody with no deviations at a level of 1 part in 10^{4}, and measured a residual temperature of 2.726 K (more recent measurements have revised this figure down slightly to 2.7255 K); then in 1992, further COBE measurements discovered tiny fluctuations (anisotropies) in the CMB temperature across the sky, at a level of about one part in 10^{5}. John C. Mather and George Smoot were awarded the 2006 Nobel Prize in Physics for their leadership in these results.

During the following decade, CMB anisotropies were further investigated by a large number of ground-based and balloon experiments. In 2000–2001, several experiments, most notably BOOMERanG, found the shape of the universe to be spatially almost flat by measuring the typical angular size (the size on the sky) of the anisotropies.

In early 2003, the first results of the Wilkinson Microwave Anisotropy Probe were released, yielding what were at the time the most accurate values for some of the cosmological parameters. The results disproved several specific cosmic inflation models, but are consistent with the inflation theory in general. The Planck space probe was launched in May 2009. Other ground and balloon-based cosmic microwave background experiments are ongoing.

=== Abundance of primordial elements ===
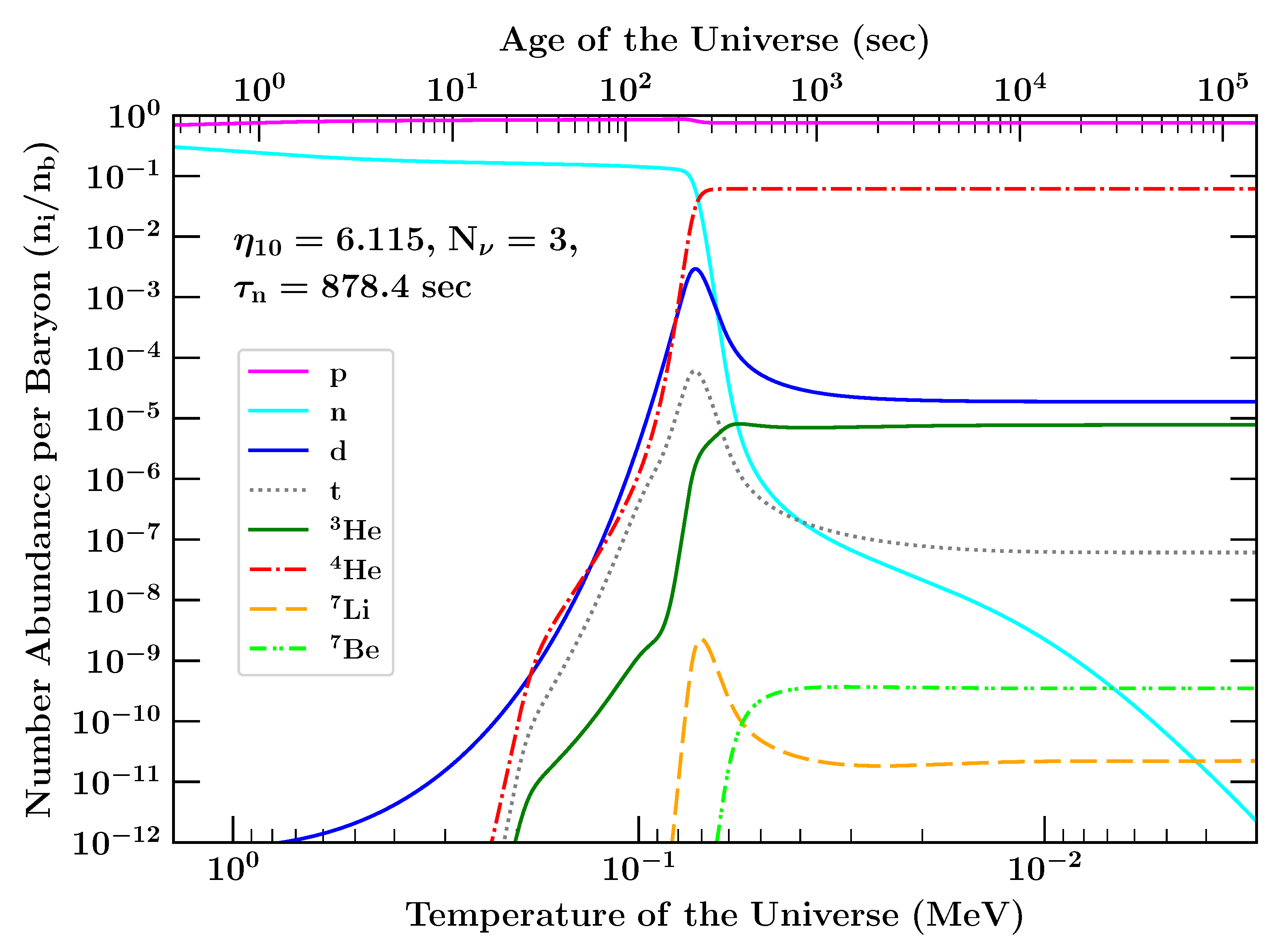
Time evolution of light element abundances during Big Bang nucleosynthesis

Using Big Bang models, it is possible to calculate the expected concentration of the isotopes helium-4 (^{4}He), helium-3 (^{3}He), deuterium (^{2}H), and lithium-7 (^{7}Li) in the universe as ratios to the amount of ordinary hydrogen. The relative abundances depend on a single parameter, the ratio of photons to baryons. This value can be calculated independently from the detailed structure of CMB fluctuations. The ratios predicted (by mass, not by abundance) are about 0.25 for ^{4}He:H, about 10^{−3} for ^{2}H:H, about 10^{−4} for ^{3}He:H, and about 10^{−9} for ^{7}Li:H.

The measured abundances all agree at least roughly with those predicted from a single value of the baryon-to-photon ratio. The agreement is excellent for deuterium, close but formally discrepant for ^{4}He, and off by a factor of two for ^{7}Li (this anomaly is known as the cosmological lithium problem); in the latter two cases, there are substantial systematic uncertainties. Nonetheless, the general consistency with abundances predicted by BBN is strong evidence for the Big Bang, as the theory is the only known explanation for the relative abundances of light elements, and it is virtually impossible to "tune" the Big Bang to produce much more or less than 20–30% helium. Indeed, there is no obvious reason outside of the Big Bang that, for example, the young universe before star formation, as determined by studying matter supposedly free of stellar nucleosynthesis products, should have more helium than deuterium or more deuterium than ^{3}He, and in constant ratios, too.

=== Galactic evolution and distribution ===
Detailed observations of the morphology and distribution of galaxies and quasars are in agreement with the current Big Bang models. A combination of observations and theory suggest that the first quasars and galaxies formed within a billion years after the Big Bang, and since then, larger structures have been forming, such as galaxy clusters and superclusters.

Populations of stars have been aging and evolving, so that distant galaxies (which are observed as they were in the early universe) appear very different from nearby galaxies (observed in a more recent state). Moreover, galaxies that formed relatively recently appear markedly different from galaxies formed at similar distances but shortly after the Big Bang. These observations are strong arguments against the steady-state model. Observations of star formation, galaxy and quasar distributions and larger structures, agree well with Big Bang simulations of the formation of structure in the universe, and are helping to complete details of the theory.

=== Primordial gas clouds ===
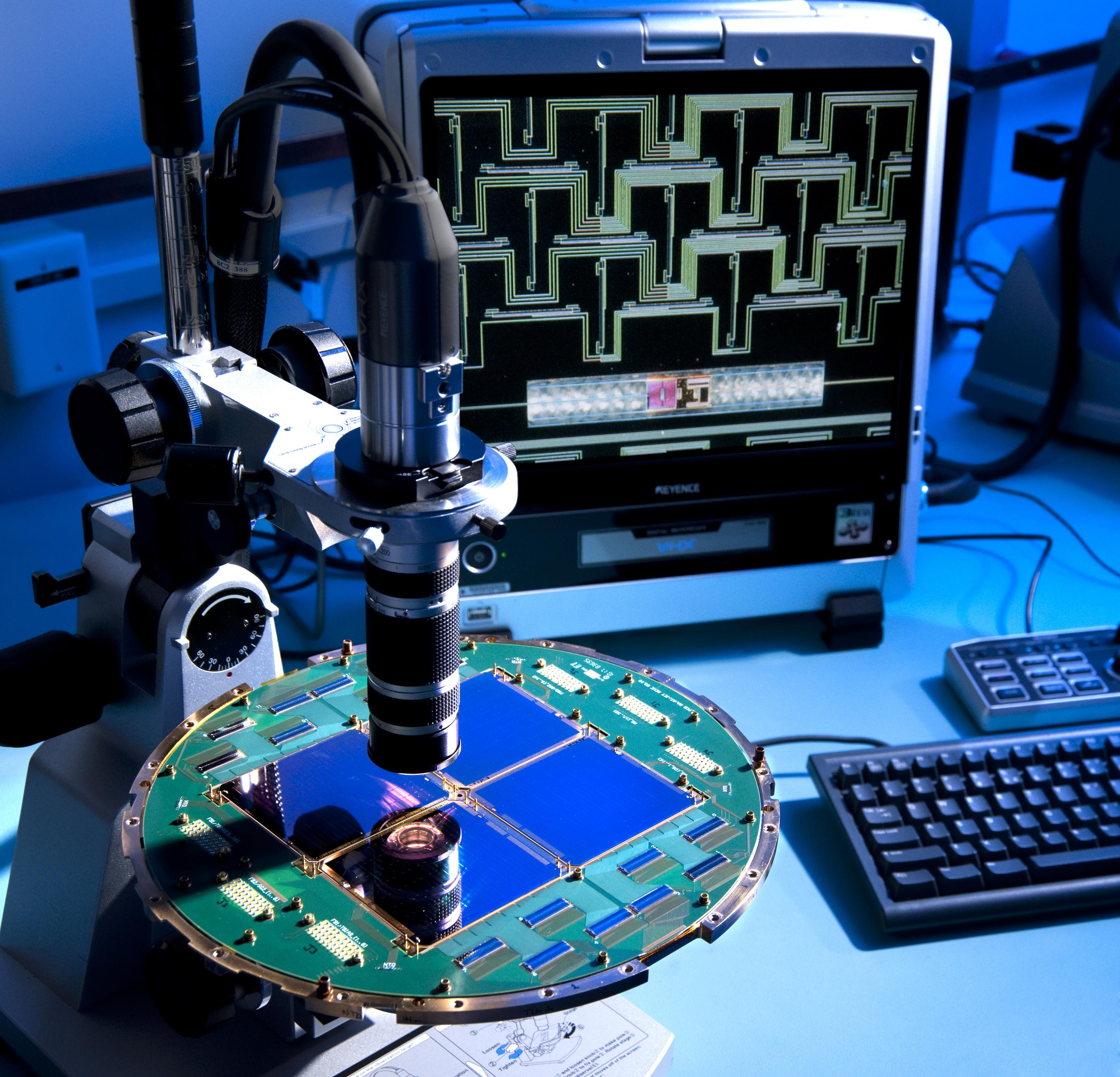
Focal plane of BICEP2 telescope under a microscope—used to search for polarization in the CMB

In 2011, astronomers found what they believe to be pristine clouds of primordial gas by analyzing absorption lines in the spectra of distant quasars. Before this discovery, all other astronomical objects have been observed to contain heavy elements that are formed in stars. Despite being sensitive to carbon, oxygen, and silicon, these three elements were not detected in these two clouds. Since the clouds of gas have no detectable levels of heavy elements, they likely formed in the first few minutes after the Big Bang, during BBN.

=== Other lines of evidence ===
The age of the universe as estimated from the Hubble expansion and the CMB is now in agreement with other estimates using the ages of the oldest stars, both as measured by applying the theory of stellar evolution to globular clusters and through radiometric dating of individual Population II stars. It is also in agreement with age estimates based on measurements of the expansion using Type Ia supernovae and measurements of temperature fluctuations in the cosmic microwave background. The agreement of independent measurements of this age supports the Lambda-CDM (ΛCDM) model, since the model is used to relate some of the measurements to an age estimate, and all estimates turn agree. Still, some observations of objects from the relatively early universe (in particular quasar APM 08279+5255) raise concern as to whether these objects had enough time to form so early in the ΛCDM model.

The prediction that the CMB temperature was higher in the past has been experimentally supported by observations of very low temperature absorption lines in gas clouds at high redshift. This prediction also implies that the amplitude of the Sunyaev–Zel'dovich effect in clusters of galaxies does not depend directly on redshift. Observations have found this to be roughly true, but this effect depends on cluster properties that do change with cosmic time, making precise measurements difficult.

=== Future observations ===
Future gravitational-wave observatories might be able to detect primordial gravitational waves, relics of the early universe, up to less than a second after the Big Bang.

== Problems and related issues in physics ==
As with any theory, a number of mysteries and problems have arisen as a result of the development of the Big Bang models. Some of these mysteries and problems have been resolved while others are still outstanding. Proposed solutions to some of the problems in the Big Bang model have revealed new mysteries of their own. For example, the horizon problem, the magnetic monopole problem, and the flatness problem are most commonly resolved with inflation theory, but the details of the inflationary universe are still left unresolved and many, including some founders of the theory, say it has been disproven. What follows are a list of the mysterious aspects of the Big Bang concept still under intense investigation by cosmologists and astrophysicists.

=== Baryon asymmetry ===
It is not yet understood why the universe has more matter than antimatter. It is generally assumed that when the universe was young and very hot it was in statistical equilibrium and contained equal numbers of baryons and antibaryons. Both matter and antimatter were much more abundant than today, with a tiny asymmetry of only one part in 10 billion. The matter and antimatter collided and annihilated, leaving only the residual amount of matter. Today observations suggest that the universe, including its most distant parts, is made almost entirely of normal matter with very little antimatter.

If matter and antimatter were in complete symmetry, then annihilation would result in only photons and virtually no matter at all, which is obviously not what is observed. A process called baryogenesis was hypothesized to account for the asymmetry. For baryogenesis to occur, the Sakharov conditions must be satisfied. These require that baryon number is not conserved, that C-symmetry and CP-symmetry are violated and that the universe depart from thermodynamic equilibrium. All these conditions occur in the Standard Model, but the effects are not strong enough to explain the present baryon asymmetry.

=== Dark energy ===
Measurements of the redshift–magnitude relation for type Ia supernovae indicate that the expansion of the universe has been accelerating since the universe was about half its present age. To explain this acceleration, cosmological models require that much of the energy in the universe consists of a component with large negative pressure, dubbed "dark energy".

Dark energy, though speculative, solves numerous problems. Measurements of the cosmic microwave background indicate that the universe is very nearly spatially flat, and therefore according to general relativity the universe must have almost exactly the critical density of mass/energy. But the mass density of the universe can be measured from its gravitational clustering, and is found to have only about 30% of the critical density. Since theory suggests that dark energy does not cluster in the usual way it is the best explanation for the "missing" energy density. Dark energy also helps to explain two geometrical measures of the overall curvature of the universe, one using the frequency of gravitational lenses, and the other using baryon acoustic oscillations, the characteristic pattern of the large-scale structure, as a cosmic ruler.

Negative pressure is believed to be a property of vacuum energy, but the exact nature and existence of dark energy remains one of the great mysteries of the Big Bang. Results from the WMAP team in 2008 are in accordance with a universe that consists of 73% dark energy, 23% dark matter, 4.6% regular matter and less than 1% neutrinos. According to theory, the energy density in matter decreases with the expansion of the universe, but the dark energy density remains constant (or nearly so) as the universe expands. Therefore, matter made up a larger fraction of the total energy of the universe in the past than it does today, but its fractional contribution will fall in the far future as dark energy becomes even more dominant.

The dark energy component of the universe has been explained by theorists using a variety of competing theories including Einstein's cosmological constant but also extending to more exotic forms of quintessence or other modified gravity schemes. A cosmological constant problem, sometimes called the "most embarrassing problem in physics", results from the apparent discrepancy between the measured energy density of dark energy, and the one naively predicted from Planck units.

=== Dark matter ===
Chart shows the proportion of different components of the universe – about 95% is dark matter and dark energy.

During the 1970s and the 1980s, various observations showed that there is not sufficient visible matter in the universe to account for the apparent strength of gravitational forces within and between galaxies. This led to the idea that up to 90% of the matter in the universe is dark matter that does not emit light or interact with normal baryonic matter. In addition, the assumption that the universe is mostly normal matter led to predictions that were strongly inconsistent with observations. In particular, the universe today is far more lumpy and contains far less deuterium than can be accounted for without dark matter. While dark matter has always been controversial, it is inferred by various observations: the anisotropies in the CMB, the galaxy rotation problem, galaxy cluster velocity dispersions, large-scale structure distributions, gravitational lensing studies, and X-ray measurements of galaxy clusters.

Indirect evidence for dark matter comes from its gravitational influence on other matter, as no dark matter particles have been observed in laboratories. Many particle physics candidates for dark matter have been proposed, and several projects to detect them directly are underway.

Additionally, there are outstanding problems associated with the currently favored cold dark matter model which include the dwarf galaxy problem and the cuspy halo problem. Alternative theories have been proposed that do not require a large amount of undetected matter, but instead modify the laws of gravity established by Newton and Einstein; yet no alternative theory has been as successful as the cold dark matter proposal in explaining all extant observations.

=== Horizon problem ===
The horizon problem results from the premise that information cannot travel faster than light. In a universe of finite age this sets a limit—the particle horizon—on the separation of any two regions of space that are in causal contact. The observed isotropy of the CMB is problematic in this regard: if the universe had been dominated by radiation or matter at all times up to the epoch of last scattering, the particle horizon at that time would correspond to about 2 degrees on the sky. There would then be no mechanism to cause wider regions to have the same temperature.

A resolution to this apparent inconsistency is offered by inflation theory in which a homogeneous and isotropic scalar energy field dominates the universe at some very early period (before baryogenesis). During inflation, the universe undergoes exponential expansion, and the particle horizon expands much more rapidly than previously assumed, so that regions presently on opposite sides of the observable universe are well inside each other's particle horizon. The observed isotropy of the CMB then follows from the fact that this larger region was in causal contact before the beginning of inflation.

Heisenberg's uncertainty principle predicts that during the inflationary phase there would be quantum thermal fluctuations, which would be magnified to a cosmic scale. These fluctuations served as the seeds for all the current structures in the universe. Inflation predicts that the primordial fluctuations are nearly scale invariant and Gaussian, which has been confirmed by measurements of the CMB.

A related issue to the classic horizon problem arises because in most standard cosmological inflation models, inflation ceases well before electroweak symmetry breaking occurs, so inflation should not be able to prevent large-scale discontinuities in the electroweak vacuum since distant parts of the observable universe were causally separate when the electroweak epoch ended.

=== Magnetic monopoles ===
The magnetic monopole objection was raised in the late 1970s. Grand unified theories (GUTs) predicted topological defects in space that would manifest as magnetic monopoles. These objects would be produced efficiently in the hot early universe, resulting in a density much higher than is consistent with observations, given that no monopoles have been found. This problem is resolved by cosmic inflation, which removes all point defects from the observable universe, in the same way that it drives the geometry to flatness.

=== Flatness problem ===
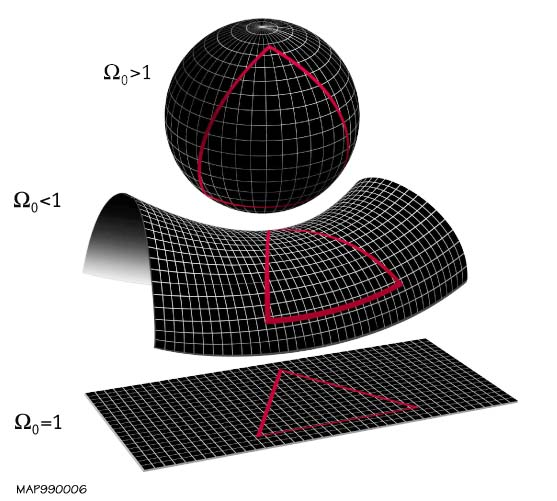
The overall geometry of the universe is determined by whether the Omega cosmological parameter is less than, equal to or greater than 1. Shown from top to bottom are a closed universe with positive curvature, a hyperbolic universe with negative curvature and a flat universe with zero curvature.

The flatness problem (also known as the oldness problem) is an observational problem associated with a FLRW. The universe may have positive, negative, or zero spatial curvature depending on its total energy density. Curvature is negative if its density is less than the critical density; positive if greater; and zero at the critical density, in which case space is said to be flat. Observations indicate the universe is consistent with being flat.

The problem is that any small departure from the critical density grows with time, and yet the universe today remains very close to flat. (Note: Strictly, dark energy in the form of a cosmological constant drives the universe towards a flat state; however, our universe remained close to flat for several billion years before the dark energy density became significant.) Given that a natural timescale for departure from flatness might be the Planck time, 10^{−43} seconds, the fact that the universe has reached neither a heat death nor a Big Crunch after billions of years requires an explanation. For instance, even at the relatively late age of a few minutes (the time of nucleosynthesis), the density of the universe must have been within one part in 10^{14} of its critical value, or it would not exist as it does today.

== Misconceptions ==
In addition to confusion about the nature of cosmic expansion, the Big Bang model itself is sometimes misunderstood.

One of the common misconceptions about the Big Bang model is that it fully explains the origin of the universe. However, the Big Bang model only describes the universe while it was in a hot and dense thermal state. Inflation occurred before the Big Bang, which only began after the energy that drove inflation was converted into a thermal plasma during reheating.

Another common misconception relates to the recession speeds associated with Hubble's law. These are not velocities in a relativistic sense (for example, they are not related to the spatial components of 4-velocities). Therefore, it is not remarkable that according to Hubble's law, galaxies farther than the Hubble distance recede faster than the speed of light. Such recession speeds do not correspond to faster-than-light travel.

Another misconception is to think of the Big Bang as an explosion of a single point into its surroundings. The expansion of the universe occurs everywhere, not at any single point. For this reason an alternative name Everywhere Stretch has been suggested to emphasize that every point in the universe expands as a consequence of general relativity.

== Implications ==
Given current understanding, scientific extrapolations about the future of the universe are only possible for finite durations, albeit for much longer periods than the current age of the universe. Anything beyond that becomes increasingly speculative. Likewise, at present, a proper understanding of the origin of the universe can only be subject to conjecture.

=== Pre–inflationary cosmology ===
There are no direct probes for what came before inflation, so extrapolations to the earliest times are necessarily more speculative. In the old Big Bang model, Lemaître called the early hot and dense initial state the "primeval atom" while Gamow called the material "ylem". How the initial state of the universe originated is still an open question, but the inflationary cosmology does constrain some of its characteristics. For example, if specific laws of nature were to come to existence in a random way, inflation models show, some combinations of these are far more probable, partly explaining why the Universe is rather stable. Another possible explanation for the stability of the Universe could be a hypothetical multiverse, which assumes every possible universe to exist, and thinking species could only emerge in those stable enough. A flat universe implies a balance between gravitational potential energy and other energy forms, requiring no additional energy to be created.

The Big Bang singularity is built upon the equations of classical general relativity, which are not expected to be valid at the origin of cosmic time, as the energy density of the universe approaches the Planck scale. Correcting this will require the development of a correct treatment of quantum gravity. Certain quantum gravity treatments, such as the Wheeler–DeWitt equation, imply that time itself could be an emergent property. As such, physics may conclude that time did not exist before the Big Bang.

While it is not known what could have preceded inflation and why it originated, speculation abounds on the subject of "cosmogony".

Some speculative proposals in this regard, each of which entails untested hypotheses, are:

- The simplest models, in which the Big Bang singularity was caused by quantum fluctuations. That scenario had very little chance of happening, but, according to the totalitarian principle, even the most improbable event will eventually happen. It took place instantly, from a human perspective, due to the absence of perceived time before the singularity.
- Emergent Universe models, which feature a low-activity past-eternal era before the inflation, resembling ancient ideas of a cosmic egg and birth of the world out of primordial chaos.
- Models in which the whole of spacetime is finite, including the Hartle–Hawking no-boundary condition. For these cases, the Big Bang singularity does represent the limit of time but without a gravitational singularity. In such a case, the universe is self-sufficient.
- Brane cosmology models, in which inflation is due to the movement of branes in string theory; the ekpyrotic model, in which the Big Bang singularity is the result of a collision between branes; and the cyclic model, a variant of the ekpyrotic model in which collisions occur periodically. In the latter model the Big Bang singularity was preceded by a Big Crunch and the universe cycles from one process to the other.
- Eternal inflation, in which universal inflation ends locally here and there in a random fashion, each end-point leading to a bubble universe, expanding from its own big bang. This is sometimes referred to as pre-big bang inflation.

Proposals in the last two categories see the Big Bang singularity as an event in either a much larger and older universe or in a multiverse.

=== Ultimate fate of the universe ===
Before observations of dark energy, cosmologists considered two scenarios for the future of the universe. If the mass density of the universe were greater than the critical density, then the universe would reach a maximum size and then begin to collapse. It would become denser and hotter again, ending with a state similar to that in which it started—a Big Crunch.

Alternatively, if the density in the universe were equal to or below the critical density, the expansion would slow down but never stop. Star formation would cease with the consumption of interstellar gas in each galaxy; stars would burn out, leaving white dwarfs, neutron stars, and black holes. Collisions between these would result in mass accumulating into larger and larger black holes. The average temperature of the universe would very gradually asymptotically approach absolute zero—a Big Freeze. Moreover, if protons are unstable, then baryonic matter would disappear, leaving only radiation and black holes. Eventually, black holes would evaporate by emitting Hawking radiation. The entropy of the universe would increase to the point where no organized form of energy could be extracted from it, a scenario known as heat death.

Modern observations of accelerating expansion imply that more and more of the currently visible universe will pass beyond an event horizon and out of contact with human observers. The eventual result is not known. The Lambda-CDM model of the universe contains dark energy in the form of a cosmological constant. This theory suggests that only gravitationally bound systems, such as galaxies, will remain together, and they too will be subject to heat death as the universe expands and cools. Other explanations of dark energy, called phantom dark energy theories, suggest that ultimately galaxy clusters, stars, planets, atoms, nuclei, and matter itself will be torn apart by the ever-increasing expansion in a so-called Big Rip.

=== Religious and philosophical interpretations ===
As a description of the origin of the universe, the Big Bang has significant bearing on religion and philosophy. As a result, it has become one of the liveliest areas in the discourse between science and religion. Some believe the Big Bang implies a creator, while others argue that Big Bang cosmology makes the notion of a creator superfluous.

== See also ==
- Anthropic principle – Hypothesis about sapient life and the universe
- Big Bounce – Model for the origin of the universe
- Black hole cosmology – Cosmological model in which the observable universe is the interior of a black hole
- Cold Big Bang – Designation of an absolute zero temperature at the beginning of the Universe
- Cosmic Calendar – Method to visualize the chronology of the universe
- Cosmogony – Theory or model concerning the origin of the universe
- Eureka: A Prose Poem – 1848 non-fiction work by Edgar Allan Poe, a Big Bang speculation
- Heat death of the universe – Possible fate of the universe. Also known as the Big Chill and the Big Freeze
- Non-standard cosmology – Models of the universe which deviate from then-current scientific consensus
- Shape of the universe – Local and global geometry of the universe
