= Static universe =

Cosmological model in which the universe does not expand

In cosmology, a static universe is a cosmological model in which the universe is not assumed to be undergoing unlimited global expansion. Such models can differ spatially and temporally, depending on the particular cosmology. A static infinite universe was first proposed by English astronomer Thomas Digges (1546–1595).

In contrast to this model, Albert Einstein proposed a temporally infinite but spatially finite model - static eternal universe - as his preferred cosmology during 1917, in his paper Cosmological Considerations in the General Theory of Relativity.

After the discovery of the redshift-distance relationship (deduced by the inverse correlation of galactic brightness to redshift) by American astronomers Vesto Slipher and Edwin Hubble, the Belgian astrophysicist and priest Georges Lemaître interpreted the redshift as evidence of universal expansion and thus a Big Bang, whereas Swiss astronomer Fritz Zwicky proposed that the redshift was caused by the photons losing energy as they passed through the matter and/or forces in intergalactic space. Zwicky's proposal would come to be termed 'tired light'—a term invented by the major Big Bang proponent Richard Tolman.

== The Einstein universe ==
During 1917, Albert Einstein added a positive cosmological constant to his equations of general relativity to counteract the attractive effects of gravity on ordinary matter, which would otherwise cause a static, spatially finite universe to either collapse or expand forever. This model of the universe became known as the Einstein World or Einstein's static universe.

This motivation ended after the proposal by the astrophysicist and Roman Catholic priest Georges Lemaître that the universe seems to be not static, but expanding. Edwin Hubble had researched data from the observations made by astronomer Vesto Slipher to confirm a relationship between redshift and distance, which forms the basis for the modern expansion paradigm that was introduced by Lemaître. According to George Gamow this caused Einstein to declare this cosmological model, and especially the introduction of the cosmological constant, his "biggest blunder".

Einstein's static universe is closed (i.e. has hyperspherical topology and positive spatial curvature), and contains uniform dust and a positive cosmological constant with value precisely $\Lambda_E = 4\pi G\rho/c^2$, where $G$ is Newtonian gravitational constant, $\rho$ is the energy density of the matter in the universe and $c$ is the speed of light. The radius of curvature of space of the Einstein universe is equal to

$$R_E = \Lambda_E^{-1/2} = {c \over \sqrt{4\pi G\rho}}.$$

The Einstein universe is one of Friedmann's solutions to Einstein's field equation for dust with density $\rho$, cosmological constant $\Lambda_E$, and radius of curvature $R_E$. It is the only non-trivial static solution to Friedmann's equations.

Because the Einstein universe soon was recognized to be inherently unstable, it was presently abandoned as a viable model for the universe. It is unstable in the sense that any slight change in either the value of the cosmological constant, the matter density, or the spatial curvature will result in a universe that either expands and accelerates forever or re-collapses to a singularity.

After Einstein renounced his cosmological constant, and embraced the Friedmann-LeMaitre model of an expanding universe, most physicists of the twentieth century assumed that the cosmological constant is zero. If so (absent some other form of dark energy), the expansion of the universe would be decelerating. However, after Saul Perlmutter, Brian P. Schmidt, and Adam G. Riess introduced the theory of an accelerating universe during 1998, a positive cosmological constant has been revived as a simple explanation for dark energy.

In 1976 Irving Segal revived the static universe in his chronometric cosmology. Similar to Zwicky, he ascribed the red shift of distant galaxies to curvature in the cosmos. Though he claimed vindication in astronomic data, others find the results to be inconclusive.

== Requirements of a static infinite model ==
In order for a static infinite universe model to be viable, it must explain three things:

First, it must explain the intergalactic redshift. Second, it must explain the cosmic microwave background radiation. Third, it must have a mechanism to re-create matter (particularly hydrogen atoms) from radiation or other sources in order to avoid a gradual 'running down' of the universe due to the conversion of matter into energy in stellar processes. With the absence of such a mechanism, the universe would consist of dead objects such as black holes and black dwarfs.

== See also ==
- Milne model
- Steady State theory
- Plasma cosmology
