= Second Cambridge Catalogue of Radio Sources =

The Second Cambridge Catalogue of Radio Sources (2C) was published in 1955 by John R Shakeshaft and colleagues. It comprised a list of 1936 sources between declinations -38 and +83, giving their right ascension, declination, both in 1950.0 coordinates, and flux density. The observations were made with the Cambridge Interferometer, at 81.5 MHz.

The data appeared to show a flux/number ('source counts') trend which precluded some cosmological models (such as the Steady-State):-

For a uniform distribution of radio sources the slope of the cumulative distribution of log(number, N) versus log (power, S) would have been -1.5, but the Cambridge data apparently implied a (log(N),log(S)) slope of nearly -3.0.

Unfortunately, this interpretation was premature as a significant number of the sources listed were later found to be the product of 'confusion', the blending of several weaker sources in the lobes of the interferometer to produce the apparent effect of a single stronger source. Key data demonstrating this came from the then-recently commissioned Mills Cross Telescope in Australia. However, subsequent statistical analysis by Hewish of the interferometer records later showed some aspects of the initial interpretation to have been broadly correct, with the correct measure of the (log(N),log(S)) slope of nearly -1.8 derived once confusion was taken into account.

The survey was superseded by the much more reliable 3C and 3CR surveys. The 3C survey also used the Cambridge Interferometer, but at 159 MHz, which helped significantly reduce the 'confusion' (see above) in the later survey.
