= Tenth Cambridge Survey of Radio Sources =

Astronomical survey

The Tenth Cambridge Survey (10C) is a radio survey at 15.7GHz using the Arcminute Microkelvin Imager Large Array, operated by the Cavendish Astrophysics Group at the University of Cambridge.
