= Steady-state model =

Model of the universe – alternative to the Big Bang model

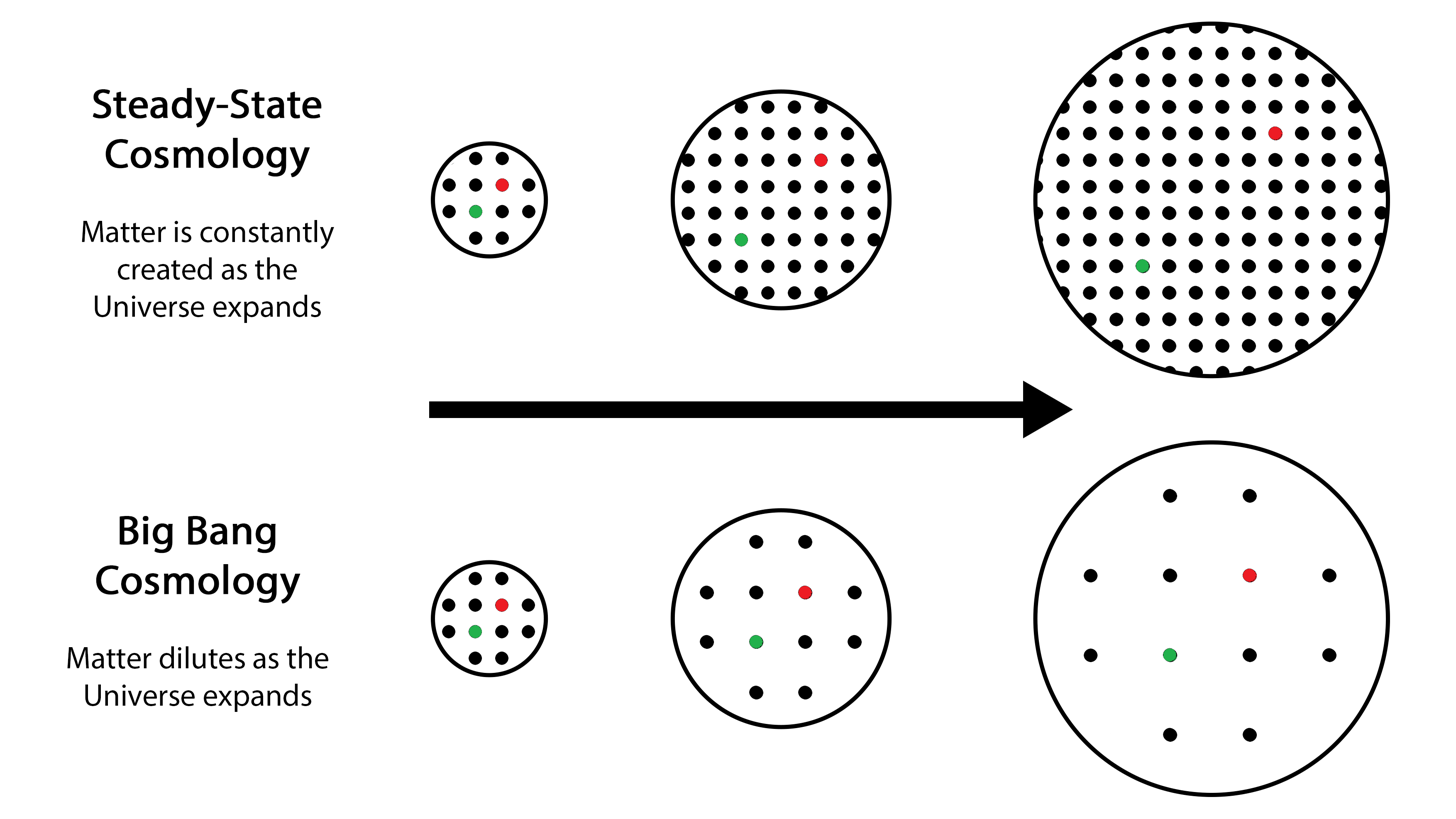
In the Big Bang, the expanding Universe causes matter to dilute over time, while in the Steady-State Theory, continued matter creation ensures that the density remains constant over time.

In cosmology, the steady-state model or steady-state theory was an alternative to the Big Bang theory. In the steady-state model, the density of matter in the expanding universe remains unchanged due to a continuous creation of matter, thus adhering to the perfect cosmological principle, a principle that says that the observable universe is always the same at any time and any place. A static universe, where space is not expanding, also obeys the perfect cosmological principle, but it cannot explain astronomical observations consistent with expansion of space.

From the 1940s to the 1960s, the astrophysical community was divided between supporters of the Big Bang theory and supporters of the steady-state theory. The steady-state model is now rejected by most cosmologists, astrophysicists, and astronomers. The observational evidence points to a hot Big Bang cosmology with a finite age of the universe, which the steady-state model does not predict.

== History ==
Cosmological expansion was originally seen through observations by Edwin Hubble. Theoretical calculations also showed that the static universe, as modelled by Albert Einstein (1917), was unstable. The modern Big Bang theory, first advanced by Father Georges Lemaître, is one in which the universe has a finite age and has evolved over time through cooling, expansion, and the formation of structures through gravitational collapse.

On the other hand, the steady-state model says while the universe is expanding, it nevertheless does not change its appearance over time (the perfect cosmological principle). In this model the universe has no beginning and no end. This required that matter be continually created in order to keep the universe's density from decreasing. Influential papers on the topic of a steady-state cosmology were published by Hermann Bondi, Thomas Gold, and Fred Hoyle in 1948. Similar models had been proposed earlier by William Duncan MacMillan, among others.

Albert Einstein considered a steady-state model of the expanding universe, as indicated in a 1931 manuscript, many years before Hoyle, Bondi and Gold, but abandoned the idea.

== Observational tests ==
=== Counts of radio sources ===
Problems with the steady-state model began to emerge in the 1950s and 1960s – observations supported the idea that the universe was changing. Bright radio sources (quasars and radio galaxies) were found only at large distances (therefore could have existed only in the distant past due to the effects of the speed of light on astronomy), not in closer galaxies. Whereas the Big Bang theory predicted as much, the steady-state model predicted that such objects would be found throughout the universe, including close to our own galaxy. By 1961, statistical tests based on radio-source surveys provided strong evidence against the steady-state model. Some proponents like Halton Arp insisted that the radio data were suspect.

=== X-ray background ===
Gold and Hoyle (1959) considered that matter that is newly created exists in a region that is denser than the average density of the universe. This matter then may radiate and cool faster than the surrounding regions, resulting in a pressure gradient. This gradient would push matter into an over-dense region and result in a thermal instability and emit a large amount of plasma. However, Gould and Burbidge (1963) realized that the thermal bremsstrahlung radiation emitted by such a plasma would exceed the amount of observed X-rays. Therefore, in the steady-state cosmological model, thermal instability does not appear to be important in the formation of galaxy-sized masses.

=== Cosmic microwave background ===
In 1964 the cosmic microwave background radiation was discovered as predicted by the Big Bang theory. The steady-state model attempted to explain the microwave background radiation as the result of light from ancient stars that has been scattered by galactic dust. However, the cosmic microwave background level is very even in all directions, making it difficult to explain how it could be generated by numerous point sources, and the microwave background radiation does not show the polarization characteristic of scattering. Furthermore, its spectrum is so close to that of an ideal black body that it could hardly be formed by the superposition of contributions from a multitude of dust clumps at different temperatures as well as at different redshifts. Steven Weinberg wrote in 1972:

"The steady state model does not appear to agree with the observed d_{L} versus z relation or with source counts ... In a sense, this disagreement is a credit to the model; alone among all cosmologies, the steady state model makes such definite predictions that it can be disproved even with the limited observational evidence at our disposal. The steady state model is so attractive that many of its adherents still retain hope that the evidence against it will eventually disappear as observations improve. However, if the cosmic microwave radiation ... is really black-body radiation, it will be difficult to doubt that the universe has evolved from a hotter denser early stage."

Since this discovery, the Big Bang theory has been considered to provide the best explanation of the origin of the universe. In most astrophysical publications, the Big Bang is implicitly accepted and is used as the basis of more complete theories.

== Quasi-steady state ==
Quasi-steady-state cosmology (QSS) was proposed in 1993 by Fred Hoyle, Geoffrey Burbidge, and Jayant V. Narlikar as a new incarnation of the steady-state ideas meant to explain additional features unaccounted for in the initial proposal. The model suggests pockets of creation occurring over time within the universe, sometimes referred to as minibangs, mini-creation events, or little bangs. After the observation of an accelerating universe, further modifications of the model were made. The Planck particle is a hypothetical black hole whose Schwarzschild radius is approximately the same as its Compton wavelength; the evaporation of such a particle has been evoked as the source of light elements in an expanding steady-state universe.

Astrophysicist and cosmologist Ned Wright has pointed out flaws in the model. These first comments were soon rebutted by the proponents. Wright and other mainstream cosmologists reviewing QSS have pointed out new flaws and discrepancies with observations left unexplained by proponents.
