= Long Michelson Interferometer =

Coordinates: 52.210°N 0.101°E

The Long Michelson Interferometer was a radio telescope interferometer built by Martin Ryle and co-workers in the late 1940s beside a rifle range to the west of Cambridge, England. The interferometer consisted of 2 fixed elements 440m apart to survey the sky using Earth rotation. It produced the Preliminary survey of the radio stars in the Northern Hemisphere at 45 MHz - 214 MHz. The telescope was operated by the Radio Astronomy Group of Cambridge University.

Martin Ryle and Antony Hewish received the Nobel Prize for Physics in 1974 for this and later work in radio interferometry.
