= Ninth Cambridge Survey of Radio Sources =

Astronomical catalogue

The 9C survey at 15 GHz (9C) is an astronomical catalogue generated from the radio observations of the Ninth Cambridge survey at 15 GHz. It was published in 2003 by the Cavendish Astrophysics Group of the University of Cambridge. The catalogue was originally made in order to locate radio sources which were interfering with observations using the Very Small Array, but the catalogue has also proved useful for other astronomical programs.

Sources are labelled 9CJHHMM+DDMM where HHMM+DDMM are the coordinates in the J2000 system, e.g. 9CJ1510+4138.
