= Milne model =

Cosmological model

Milne's model follows the description from special relativity of an observable universe's spacetime diagram containing past and future light cones along with "elsewhere" in spacetime.

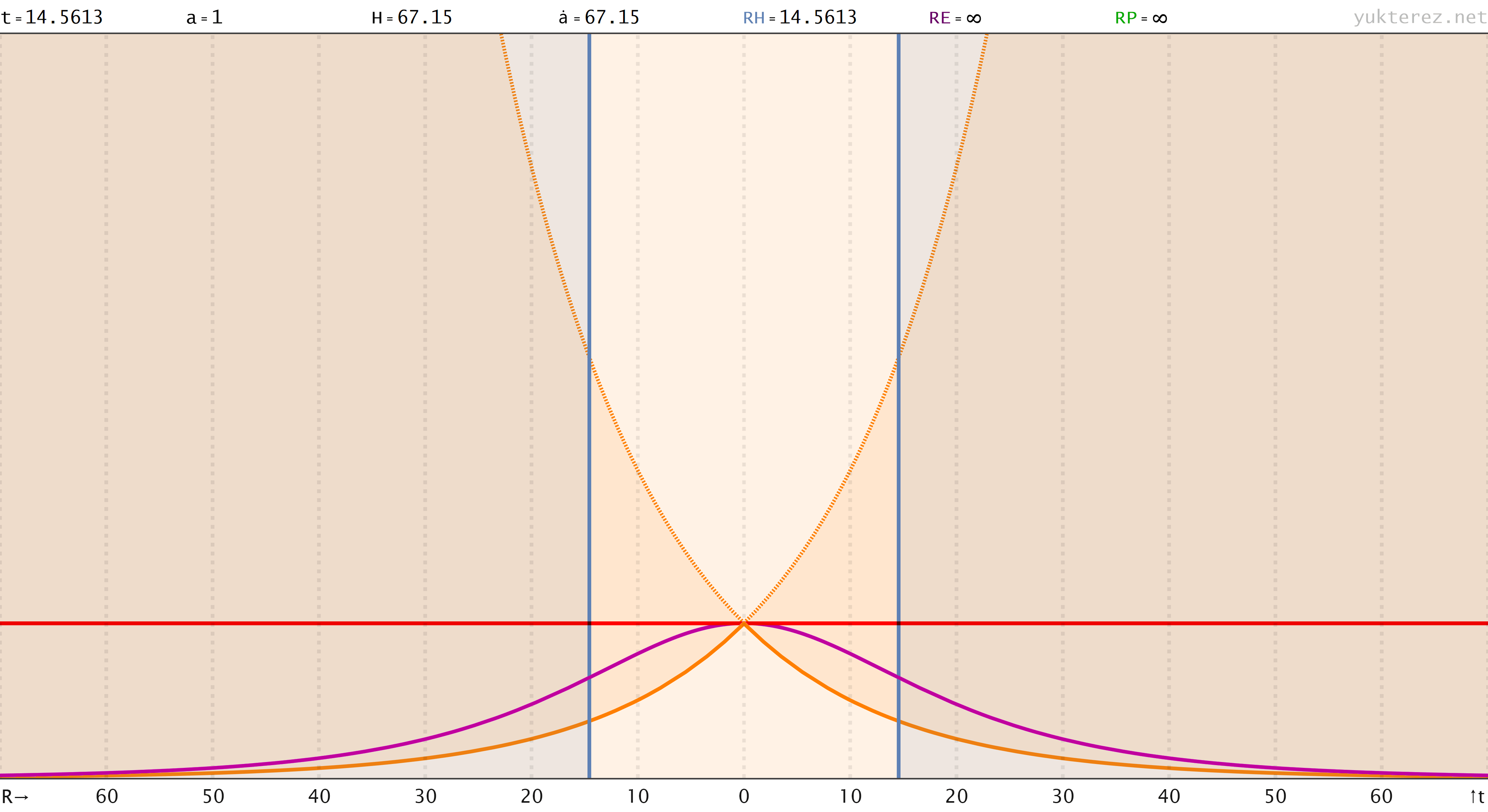
Milne's model in comoving FLRW coordinates: the Hubble radius (blue) is at a constant comoving distance. The past and future light cone are depicted in orange, the Minkowskian hypersurface of the present in purple and the hypersurface of constant FLRW time in red.

The Milne model was a special-relativistic cosmological model of the universe proposed by Edward Arthur Milne in 1935. It is mathematically equivalent to a special case of the FLRW model in the limit of zero energy density and it obeys the cosmological principle. The Milne model is also similar to Rindler space in that both are simple re-parameterizations of flat Minkowski space.

Since it features both zero energy density and maximally negative spatial curvature, the Milne model is inconsistent with cosmological observations. Cosmologists actually observe the universe's density parameter to be consistent with unity and its curvature to be consistent with flatness.

== Milne metric ==
The Milne universe is a special case of a more general Friedmann–Lemaître–Robertson–Walker model (FLRW). The Milne solution can be obtained from the more generic FLRW model by demanding that the energy density, pressure and cosmological constant all equal zero and the spatial curvature is negative. From these assumptions and the Friedmann equations it follows that the scale factor must depend on time coordinate linearly.

Setting the spatial curvature and speed of light to unity the metric for a Milne universe can be expressed with hyperspherical coordinates as:

$$ds^2 = dt^2-t^2(d \chi ^2+\sinh^2{\chi} d\Omega^2)\$$

where

$$d\Omega^2 = d\theta^2+\sin^2\theta d\phi^2\$$

is the metric for a two-sphere and

$$\chi = \sinh^{-1}{r}$$

is the curvature-corrected radial component for negatively curved space that varies between 0 and $+\infin$.

The empty space that the Milne model describes can be identified with the inside of a light cone of an event in Minkowski space by a change of coordinates.

Milne developed this model independent of general relativity but with awareness of special relativity. As he initially described it, the model has no expansion of space, so all of the redshift (except that caused by peculiar velocities) is explained by a recessional velocity associated with the hypothetical "explosion". However, the mathematical equivalence of the zero energy density ($\rho = 0$) version of the FLRW metric to Milne's model implies that a full general relativistic treatment using Milne's assumptions would result in a linearly increasing scale factor for all time since the deceleration parameter is uniquely zero for such a model.

== Milne's density function ==
Milne proposed that the universe's density changes in time because of an initial outward explosion of matter. Milne's model assumes an inhomogeneous density function which is Lorentz Invariant (around the event t=x=y=z=0). When rendered graphically Milne's density distribution shows a three-dimensional spherical Lobachevskian pattern with outer edges moving outward at the speed of light. Every inertial body perceives itself to be at the center of the explosion of matter (see observable universe), and sees the local universe as homogeneous and isotropic in the sense of the cosmological principle.

In order to be consistent with general relativity, the universe's density must be negligible in comparison to the critical density at all times for which the Milne model is taken to apply.
