= Cosmological perturbation theory =

Theory of the evolution of cosmological structure

In physical cosmology, cosmological perturbation theory is the theory by which the evolution of structure is understood in the Big Bang model. Cosmological perturbation theory may be broken into two categories: Newtonian or general relativistic. Each case uses its governing equations to compute gravitational and pressure forces which cause small perturbations to grow and eventually seed the formation of stars, quasars, galaxies and clusters. Both cases apply only to situations where the universe is predominantly homogeneous, such as during cosmic inflation and large parts of the Big Bang. The universe is believed to still be homogeneous enough that the theory is a good approximation on the largest scales, but on smaller scales more involved techniques, such as N-body simulations, must be used. When deciding whether to use general relativity for perturbation theory, note that Newtonian physics is only applicable in some cases such as for scales smaller than the Hubble horizon, where spacetime is sufficiently flat, and for which speeds are non-relativistic.

Due to the gauge invariance of general relativity, the correct formulation of cosmological perturbation theory is subtle. In particular, when describing an inhomogeneous spacetime, there are often no preferred coordinate choices. There are currently two distinct approaches to perturbation theory in classical general relativity:

- gauge-invariant perturbation theory based on foliating a spacetime with hyper-surfaces, and
- 1+3 covariant gauge-invariant perturbation theory based on threading a spacetime with frames.

== Newtonian perturbation theory ==
Focusing on the effect of matter on structure formation in the hydrodynamical fluid regime is useful because dark matter has dominated structure growth for most of the universe's history. This regime is on sub-Hubble scales $< H^{-1},$ (where $H$ is the Hubble parameter), whereupon spacetime can be taken to be flat, and the effects of general relativity can be neglected. But these scales are above a cut-off, such that perturbations in pressure and density are sufficiently linear $\delta P ~, ~ \delta \rho \ll 1$. Assume low pressure $P\ll \rho~,$ so that radiative effects can be ignored, and low speeds $u\ll c$, making relativistic effects negligible.

The first governing equation follows from matter conservation, namely, the continuity equation

$$\frac{\partial \rho}{\partial t} + 3 H \rho + \frac{1}{a} \cdot \nabla \left( \rho \boldsymbol{v} \right) = 0,$$

where $a$ is the scale factor and $\boldsymbol{v}$ is the peculiar velocity. All variables are evaluated at time $t$ and the divergence $\nabla$ is in comoving coordinates. The second equation is the Euler equation

$$\rho\frac{d\vec u}{dt} = \rho\left(\frac{\partial}{\partial t} + \frac{1}{a} \boldsymbol{v} \cdot \nabla\right)\boldsymbol{u} = -\frac{1}{a}\nabla P - \frac{1}{a}\rho \nabla \Phi,$$

where $\Phi$ is the gravitational potential. It is a consequence of momentum conservation. In the Newtonian limit, the potential obeys Poisson's equation for gravity

$$\frac{1}{a^2}\nabla^2 \Phi = 4\pi G \rho~.$$

The equations so far are fully nonlinear, and can be hard to interpret intuitively. It is therefore useful to consider a perturbative expansion and examine each order separately,

$$\rho = \bar\rho(1+\delta),\quad \boldsymbol{u} = Ha \boldsymbol{x} +\boldsymbol{v}, \quad P = \bar P + \delta P ~, ~ \Phi = \bar \Phi + \delta \Phi.$$

where $\boldsymbol{x}$ is a comoving coordinate.

At linear order, the continuity equation becomes

$$\dot \delta = -\frac{1}{a}\theta~,$$

where $\theta\equiv \nabla \cdot \boldsymbol{v}$ is the velocity divergence. And the linear Euler equation is

$$\bar\rho \left(\dot{\boldsymbol{v}} + H \boldsymbol{v}\right) = -\frac{1}{a} \nabla \delta P - \frac{1}{a}\bar\rho \nabla \delta \Phi~.$$

Combining the continuity equation, Euler, and Poisson equations yields a simple master equation governing evolution

$$\left(\frac{\partial^2}{\partial^2 t} + 2H \frac{\partial}{\partial t} - c_s^2 \frac{1}{a}\nabla^2 - 4\pi G \bar \rho \right)\delta = 0,$$

where the speed of sound is defined to be $c_s^2 \equiv \delta P / \bar \rho \delta$, giving a closure relation. This master equation admits wave solutions in $\delta(\boldsymbol{x}, t)$, describing how matter fluctuations grow over time due to a combination of competing effects: the fluctuation's self-gravity, pressure forces, the universe's expansion, and the background gravitational field.

== Gauge-invariant perturbation theory ==
The gauge-invariant perturbation theory is based on developments by Bardeen (1980), Kodama and Sasaki (1984) building on the work of Lifshitz (1946). This is the standard approach to perturbation theory of general relativity for cosmology. This approach is widely used for the computation of anisotropies in the cosmic microwave background radiation as part of the physical cosmology program and focuses on predictions arising from linearisations that preserve gauge invariance with respect to Friedmann-Lemaître-Robertson-Walker (FLRW) models. This approach draws heavily on the use of Newtonian like analogue and usually has as it starting point the FRW background around which perturbations are developed. The approach is non-local and coordinate dependent but gauge invariant as the resulting linear framework is built from a specified family of background hyper-surfaces which are linked by gauge preserving mappings to foliate the space-time. Although intuitive this approach does not deal well with the nonlinearities natural to general relativity.

== 1+3 covariant gauge-invariant perturbation theory ==
In relativistic cosmology using the Lagrangian threading dynamics of Ehlers (1971) and Ellis (1971) it is usual to use the gauge-invariant covariant perturbation theory developed by Hawking (1966) and Ellis and Bruni (1989). Here rather than starting with a background and perturbing away from that background one starts with full general relativity and systematically reduces the theory down to one that is linear around a particular background. The approach is local and both covariant as well as gauge invariant but can be non-linear because the approach is built around the local comoving observer frame (see frame bundle) which is used to thread the entire space-time. This approach to perturbation theory produces differential equations that are of just the right order needed to describe the true physical degrees of freedom and as such no non-physical gauge modes exist. It is usual to express the theory in a coordinate free manner. For applications of kinetic theory, because one is required to use the full tangent bundle, it becomes convenient to use the tetrad formulation of relativistic cosmology. The application of this approach to the computation of anisotropies in cosmic microwave background radiation requires the linearization of the full relativistic kinetic theory developed by Thorne (1980) and Ellis, Matravers and Treciokas (1983).

== Gauge freedom and frame fixing ==
In relativistic cosmology there is a freedom associated with the choice of threading frame; this frame choice is distinct from the choice associated with coordinates. Picking this frame is equivalent to fixing the choice of timelike world lines mapped into each other. This reduces the gauge freedom; it does not fix the gauge but the theory remains gauge invariant under the remaining gauge freedoms. In order to fix the gauge a specification of correspondences between the time surfaces in the real universe (perturbed) and the background universe are required along with the correspondences between points on the initial spacelike surfaces in the background and in the real universe. This is the link between the gauge-invariant perturbation theory and the gauge-invariant covariant perturbation theory. Gauge invariance is only guaranteed if the choice of frame coincides exactly with that of the background; usually this is trivial to ensure because physical frames have this property.

== Newtonian-like equations ==
Newtonian-like equations emerge from perturbative general relativity with the choice of the Newtonian gauge; the Newtonian gauge provides the direct link between the variables typically used in the gauge-invariant perturbation theory and those arising from the more general gauge-invariant covariant perturbation theory.

== See also ==
- Primordial fluctuations
- Cosmic microwave background spectral distortions

== Bibliography ==
See physical cosmology textbooks.
