= GQ Lupi b =

Substellar companion to the star GQ Lupi

GQ Lupi b/B
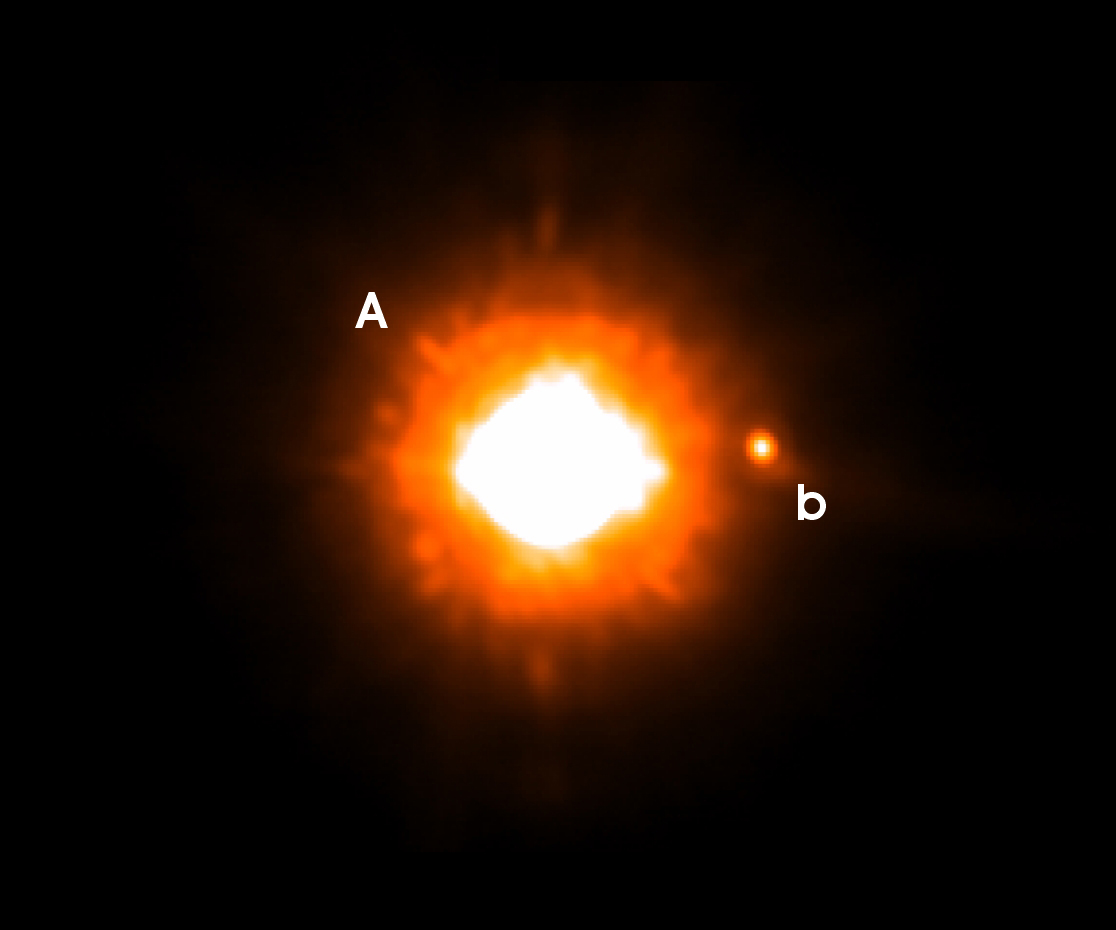
- Direct imaging of GQ Lupi b and its host star, in a near-infrared wavelength. The companion is 250 times fainter than the star itself and it located 0.73" west. At the distance of GQ Lupi, this corresponds to a separation of roughly 100 AU. North is up and East is to the left.

Discovery
- Discovered by: Neuhäuser et al.
- Discovery site: ESO's Paranal Observatory, Chile
- Discovery date: April 2005
- Detection method: Direct imaging

Orbital characteristics
- Periastron: 63.5 (Note: calculated with a = 1−e, where a is the semi-major axis and e is the eccentricity) au
- Apoastron: 132 (Note: calculated with a = 1+e, where a is the semi-major axis and e is the eccentricity) au
- Semi-major axis: 97.7+8.9 −7.1 au
- Eccentricity: 0.35+0.10 −0.09
- Orbital period (sidereal): 921+159 −124 (Note: Calculated using P^{2} = a^{3} / M_{tot}, where a is the semi-major axis in astronomical units, M_{tot} is the total mass of the system, in M_{☉}, and P is the period in years. Upper error bar calculated with the −7.14 uncertainty in a and +0.07 in M_{tot}. Lower error bar calculated with the +8.92 uncertainty in a and −0.06 in M_{tot}.) years
- Inclination: 48°+4° −5°
- Longitude of ascending node: 257°+8° −5°
- Argument of periastron: 176°+10° −24°
- Star: GQ Lupi A

Physical characteristics
- Mean radius: 3.7±0.7 R_{J}
- Mass: 30 (10 – 40) M_{J} 22+2 −3 M_{J} 33±10 M_{J} 26.4+2.9 −3.8 M_{J} 30.1+1.1 −1.2 M_{J}
- Surface gravity: 3.83+0.17 −0.18 or 3.14±0.12 cgs
- Temperature: 2719±14 K
- Spectral type: M9 (M8 – M9)

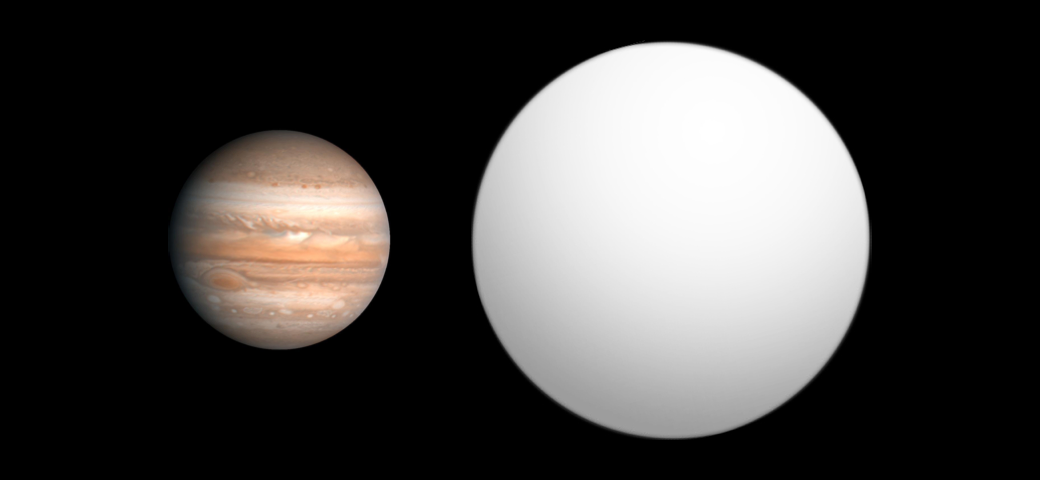
Size comparison with Jupiter

GQ Lupi b, or GQ Lupi B is a substellar companion to the T Tauri star GQ Lupi. Classified as either an exoplanet or a brown dwarf, this object is still in the early stages of its formation, accreting gas from its circumplanetary disk. GQ Lupi b is orbiting at nearly 100 astronomical units from the star, with an estimated orbital period around a millennium. The object was discovered by R. Neuhäuser et al., through direct imaging and announced in April 2005, less than a month before the full confirmation of 2M1207b was announced. Along with 2M1207b, this was one of the first extrasolar planet candidates to be directly imaged.

== Discovery ==
GQ Lupi b was discovered in 2005 by a team led by R. Neuhäuser. By analysing data taken from the NACO adaptive optics aboard the Very Large Telescope, they discovered a faint companion to GQ Lupi A, and combining this with archival observations from the Subaru and Hubble Space Telescopes, they were able to confirm that the companion co-moves with the star and thus is gravitationally bound. At the time, this was considered to be the first direct imaging discovery of a planetary-mass companion orbiting a star. The image was made with the European Southern Observatory's VLT telescope at the Paranal Observatory, Chile on June 25, 2004. In 2006, the IAU's Working Group on Extrasolar Planets described GQ Lup b as a "possible planetary-mass companion to a young star".

== Location ==
GQ Lupi b is within the Lupus I molecular cloud, a star-forming region that is part of the Scorpius–Centaurus association. The cloud is located at a distance of roughly 460 ± 160 light-years (140 ± 50 parsecs). The GQ Lupi system is located at a distance of 501.7+2.2
−2.7 ly (153.82+0.67
−0.82 pc). As seen from Earth, it is within the constellation of Lupus.

== Orbit and surroundings ==
GQ Lupi b orbits at a semi-major axis of 98 astronomical units from its host star, having a moderate orbital eccentricity of 0.35. This means that the farthest passage (apoastron) occurs at 132 au while the closest passage (periastron) occurs at 64 au. The orbital period is of roughly 920 years, and the orbit's inclination relative to Earth is 48°.

=== Host star ===
GQ Lupi is a T Tauri star, with a variable apparent magnitude ranging from 11.3 at brightest and 14.3 at faintest. Its spectral type is K7Ve, with the 'e' indicating emission lines in the spectrum, which in classical T Tauri stars such as GQ Lupi results from a surrounding, extensive disk. The star has 1.03±0.05 times the mass of the Sun, 1.75+0.06
−0.07 times the Sun's radius, and an effective temperature of 4306±35 K. Its estimated age is 2.8+1.8
−1.1 million years, which is thought to be the same of GQ Lupi b.

GQ Lupi also likely has a more widely-separated stellar companion, named 2MASS J15491331-3539118 or GQ Lupi C. This star has a projected separation of from 2400 au from the primary, has roughly 0.15 times the mass of the Sun, 0.9 times the Sun's radius, and an effective temperature of 3200 K.

=== Circumplanetary material ===
Emission by hydrogen in the near-infrared (Paschen-beta) was first detected in 2007 with the Very Large Telescope (VLT). This was interpreted as a sign of accretion of material from a disk. Additionally H-alpha emission was detected with Hubble.

As a very young object, GQ Lupi b is still embedded in its circumplanetary disk, composed by gas and dust, and accretes gas from it. The disk has a radius of 80±10 R_{J} and is inclined at 85.6±0.5° relative to Earth. There is evidence for a cavity within the disk, which has been suggested to be caused the accretion of dust by forming satellites. Thus, the disk of GQ Lupi b may be in its late stages where the formation of satellites is taking place and the inner parts were already cleared. The accretion rate of GQ Lupi b is estimated at 3.2×10^{−7} M_{J} per year.

== Physical parameters ==
As a young object that is still contracting, GQ Lupi b still retain a fairly large radius and a hot temperature when compared to older objects. Cold substellar objects are predicted to have radii below 1.2 R_{J}, while GQ Lupi b is over double or triple this.

=== Mass ===
In the early years following its discovery, the models of thermal evolution for substellar objects, used to infer a mass estimate for such objects based on their luminosities (or temperatures) and ages, were not calibrated to objects as young as GQ Lupi, which combined with uncertainties on the luminosity, made its mass very uncertain. Taking the age of the companion as 1.1 Myr and the luminosity as 4.3+6.7
−2.6×10^{−3} L_{☉}, the discovery paper derived a mass of 1 – 42 M_{J} based on the combination of three evolutionary models. One of these models, from Wuchterl & Tscharnuter (2003), were consistent with an object of just 1 – 2 M_{J}. This estimate assumed that the object formed in a protoplanetary disk and was subsequently challenged as such a formation scenario would need at least a million years, in tension with the estimated age of the system. Janson et al. (2006) derived masses between 12 and 40 M_{J} based on GQ Lup b's luminosity, and between 3 and 20 M_{J} based on its effective temperature of 1200–2500 K. Marois et al. (2006) then derived masses of 15 M_{J} and 10 – 20 M_{J} based on different models and an updated luminosity of 3.80+0.67
−0.57×10^{−3} L_{☉}, hence a range of 10 – 20 M_{J} was adopted.

Seifahrt et al. (2007) came up with a mass derived independently from evolutionary models, based on the relation of surface gravity, radius, and mass. They arrived at a value of 20 M_{J}, but due to the uncertainty of both radius and surface gravity, this value is also uncertain, and could be as high as 155 M_{J} and as low as 4 M_{J}. The upper range was narrowed down to 36 M_{J} based on comparisons to the brown dwarf 2M0535-05 B, which it was thought to be coeval with GQ Lupi B at 1 Myr and had its mass (36 M_{J}) and radius (5.0 R_{J}) measured independently from the models. Based on the same calculations of Seifahrt et al. (2007) and an updated radius, Neuhäuser et al. (2008) derived a nominal value of 20 M_{J} with a lower value of a few M_{J} and an upper value constrained by the comparisons with 2M0535-05 B. The nominal value agreed with the expectations of evolutionary models, but the uncertainties on such models still allowed for highly different values. The mass estimates from this epoch were thus consistent with GQ Lupi b being either a lower-mass gas giant exoplanet (which would give it the designation GQ Lup b) or a higher-mass brown dwarf (which would give it the designation GQ Lup B).

In the years that followed, updated and more robust evolutionary models, precise measurements of the distance by the Gaia spacecraft resulting in accurate luminosity measurements, and revised age estimates for the system, helped narrowing down the range of estimated masses. Stolker et al. (2021) came up with a mass of 30 M_{J} based on a revised absolute magnitude with the Gaia distance, an assumed age of 3 Myr that was consistent with a range of 2–5 Myr derived in 2012, and AMES-Dusty evolutionary models from 2000. While this value was considered uncertain, other parameters derived with the same model showed agreement with those from atmospheric models. Using an effective temperature of 2638+33
−51 K and an age between 2 and 5 Myr, Demars et al. (2023) obtained a mass of 22+2
−3 M_{J} based on ATMO evolutionary tracks (2015). Using the updated luminosity from the Gaia distance (7.08+1.83
−1.46×10^{−3} L_{☉}) and an age of 2.5+1.5
−0.9 Myr, Xuan et al. (2024) derived a mass of 33±10 M_{J} based on four evolutionary models which "have been shown to reasonably reproduce the bulk properties of benchmark substellar companions with dynamical masses". Kammerer et al. (2025), adopting an age of 3.5±1.5 Myr and a luminosity of 3.24+0.86
−1.03×10^{−3} L_{☉} derived from a single passband, obtained 26.4+2.9
−3.8 M_{J} from evolutionary models.

While improvements in the evolutionary models and the inclusion of brown dwarf binaries increased the robustness of the mass estimates, all of them are based on differing age estimates and the models still remain largely uncalibrated at the youngest ages and planetary masses. This is well visible in the case of GQ Lup b in differences of up to about 40% in best mass estimates like ~20±10 vs. 33±10 M_{J}, both published in 2024, partially remaining large error ranges like 10 – 40 M_{J}, as well as higher mass despite lower age estimate (33±10 M_{J} at 2.5+1.5
−0.9 Myr) vs. lower mass despite higher age estimate (26.4+2.9
−3.8 M_{J} at 3.5±1.5 Myr).

=== Radius ===
The first estimate of the radius was performed by the discovery paper. By comparing their low-resolution spectrum to atmosphere models and assuming a distance of 140 parsecs (460 ly) based on membership to the Lupus I cloud, they found a best-fit radius of 2 R_{J}. In 2006, Marois et al. derived a radius of 3.7±0.5 R_{J} by comparing the obtained spectrum to model atmospheres and assuming the same distance. In 2007, Seifahrt et al. found a radius of 3.50+1.50
−1.03 R_{J} based on the estimated luminosity and effective temperature, while Neuhäuser et al. (2008) refined it to 3.0±0.5 R_{J} based on a more precise luminosity.

In 2012, Patience et al. inferred radii between 4.4 and 8.6 R_{J} as a way to match the best-fitting model atmosphere to the observed brightness. Zhou et al. (2014) arrived at an estimate of 4.6±1.4 R_{J} by scaling synthetic spectra to the spectral energy distribution (SED).

Stolker et al. (2021) analysed the full spectral energy distribution of GQ Lupi b and obtained a radius of 3.77 R_{J} from an atmosphere model taking in account interstellar extinction and the surrounding protolunar disk. Demars et al. (2023) obtained a mass of 4.20+0.25
−0.13 R_{J} from their best-fit atmospheric model, but they note that evolutionary tracks would predict a smaller radius of 2.65–3.3 R_{J}. This could be due to evolutionary tracks not capturing the physics of GQ Lupi b such as deuterium burning, but is more likely to be to an inaccurate estimate of the extinction in the atmospheric model. They note this discrepancy is not unique to GQ Lupi b and might indicate that it is a close binary of nearly identical components in terms of luminosity and temperature, which would result in a radius of 3 R_{J} for each and agree with evolutionary tracks. Radial velocity measurements have not detected such a companion.

Cugno et al. (2024) found radii of 3.60±0.03 R_{J} and 3.67±0.02 R_{J}, by analysing the spectral energy distribution of the companion with the best-fitting atmospheric models that take in account the contributions of the circumplanetary disk, which are stronger at longer wavelengths, and accretion. Xuan et al. (2024) obtained a radius of 3.7±0.7 R_{J} based on evolutionary models adopting a system age of 2.5+1.5
−0.9 Myr and a luminosity of 7.08+1.83
−1.46×10^{−3} L_{☉}.

=== Effective temperature ===
The first temperature measurement was performed by the discovery paper by comparing the spectrum to model atmospheres, which resulted in 2000 K. Marois et al. (2006) used the same technique and obtained 2335±100 K with their spectra. The same was done by Seifahrt et al. (2007) who obtained 2650±100 K.

Stolker et al. (2021) obtained 2700 K by comparing the full spectral energy distribution (SED) of GQ Lupi b to an atmosphere model taking in account interstellar extinction and the surrounding disk. Demars et al. (2023) obtained 2638+33
−51 K from their best-fit atmospheric model. Cugno et al. (2024) obtained 2717±14 K and 2719±14 K by comparing the SED to the best-fitting atmospheric models that take in account the surrounding disk and accretion.

== Formation ==
There are at least three formation pathways that can form a gas giant substellar companion: bottom-up accretion in a protoplanetary disk (also called core accretion), gravitational instability in a circumstellar disk or the fragmentation of a molecular cloud, both of which are 'top-down' channels. The first two mechanisms are able to generate giant planets and objects beyond the deuterium burning limit in the protoplanetary disk, while the last one is considered a stellar formation mechanism, that can form objects of planetary mass, brown dwarfs or stars.

GQ Lupi b has most likely formed through cloud fragmentation, similar to a star (in this case a failed star) or by disk instability, like a planet within the disk (in this case a brown dwarf or exoplanet). Its circumplanetary disk is likely misaligned with the circumstellar disk of GQ Lupi, which is consistent with formation through collapse of a molecular cloud, similar to stars, or through instability in the circumstellar disk, if the object formed far from the disk's midplane or if the disk is originally asymmetric. Measurements of the companion's orbit have found it to be misaligned with the host star's disk and spin axis, and to be mildly eccentric, which in combination with the chemical composition, points toward formation through cloud fragmentation. Its formation mechanism is, however, not yet unequivocally determined, as the companion's ^{12}C/^{13}C isotope ratio and C/O ratio are roughly the same as for the host star, which is consistent with both objects having formed from a shared material reservoir, so either forming through cloud fragmentation or disk instability, and the latter formation mechanism is suggested by its higher than expected accretion rate.

== See also ==
- DH Tauri b
- List of largest exoplanets
