= DLA0817g =

Disc galaxy in the constellation Cancer

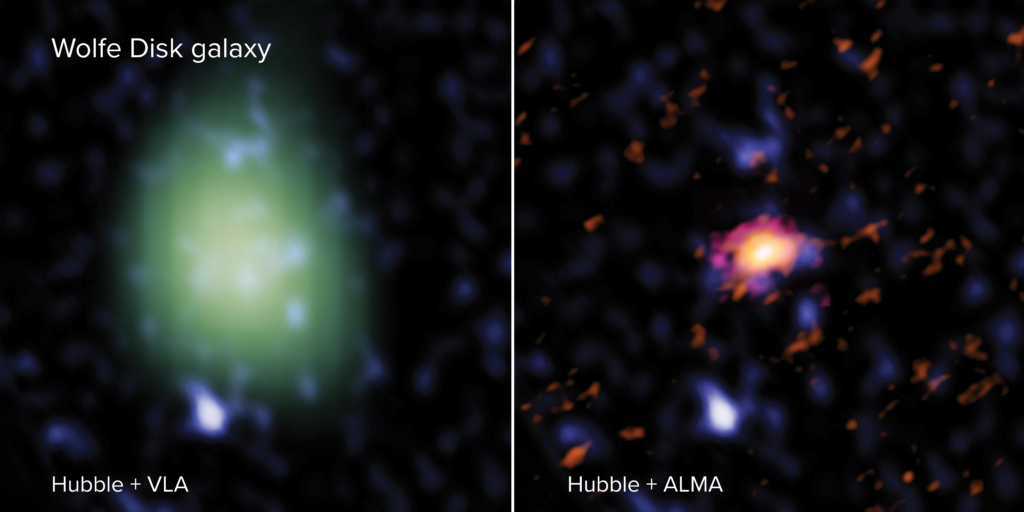
- Hubble–VLA (left) and Hubble-ALMA false color images of Wolf Disk galaxy

Observation data
- Constellation: Cancer
- Right ascension: 08^{h} 17^{m} 40.8^{s}
- Declination: +13° 51′ 38″
- Distance: 12.276 billion light years (light travel distance)

Characteristics
- Type: Disc galaxy

Other designations
- ALMA J081740.86 + 135138.2

DLA0817g, also known as the Wolfe Disk, is a galaxy located in the constellation Cancer, 12.276 billion light-years (3.764 billion parsecs) from Earth.

Discovered in 2017 using observations made with the Atacama Large Millimeter Array (ALMA), it was studied with the Karl G. Jansky Very Large Array (JVLA) observatory and the Hubble Space Telescope.

It is a large rotating disc galaxy, with a mass of approximately 72 billion solar masses, dating back to an early age in the life of the universe, approximately 1.5 billion years after the Big Bang. This contradicts previous models that describe the formation and evolution of galaxies and that foresee a gradual and progressive increase in galactic dimensions.

This galaxy has other characteristics that appear early compared to its age. Its rotational speed, approximately 272 km/s (610,000 mph), is also comparable to that of a mature galaxy like our Milky Way galaxy. It is nicknamed the Wolfe Galaxy or the Wolfe Disc in honor of Arthur M. Wolfe, an American astrophysicist, one of the discoverers of the Sachs–Wolfe effect.
