= Redshift-space distortions =

Spatial distortion in cosmology

Redshift-space distortions are an effect in observational cosmology where the spatial distribution of galaxies appears squashed and distorted when their positions are plotted as a function of their redshift rather than as a function of their distance. The effect is due to the peculiar velocities of the galaxies causing a Doppler shift in addition to the redshift caused by the cosmological expansion.

Redshift-space distortions (RSDs) manifest in two particular ways. The Fingers of God effect is where the galaxy distribution is elongated in redshift space, with an axis of elongation pointed toward the observer. It is caused by a Doppler shift associated with the random peculiar velocities of galaxies bound in structures such as clusters. The large velocities that lead to this effect are associated with the gravity of the cluster by means of the virial theorem; they change the observed redshifts of the galaxies in the cluster. The deviation from the Hubble's law relationship between distance and redshift is altered, and this leads to inaccurate distance measurements.

A closely related effect is the Kaiser effect, in which the distortion is caused by the coherent motions of galaxies as they fall inwards towards the cluster center as the cluster assembles. Depending on the particular dynamics of the situation, the Kaiser effect usually leads not to an elongation, but an apparent flattening ("pancakes of God"), of the structure. It is a much smaller effect than the fingers of God, and can be distinguished by the fact that it occurs on larger scales.

The previous effects are a consequence of special relativity, and have been observed in real data. There are additional effects that arise from general relativity. One is gravitational redshift distortion, which arises from the net gravitational redshift, or blueshift, that is acquired when the photon climbs out of the gravitational potential well of the distant galaxy and then falls into the potential well of the Milky Way galaxy. This effect will make galaxies at a higher gravitational potential than Earth appear slightly closer, and galaxies at lower potential will appear farther away.

The other effects of general relativity on clustering statistics are observed when the light from a background galaxy passes near, or through, a closer galaxy or cluster. These two effects are the integrated Sachs-Wolfe effect (ISW) and gravitational lensing. ISW arises because large-scale gravitational potentials are decaying in time (due to dark energy), so that a photon passing through a low area of gravitational potential gains more energy on entry than it loses on exit, making the background galaxy appear closer. Gravitational lensing, unlike all of the previous effects, distorts the apparent position, and number, of background galaxies.

The RSDs measured in galaxy redshift surveys can be used as a cosmological probe in their own right, providing information on how structure formed in the Universe, and how gravity behaves on large scales.

== See also ==
- Cosmic microwave background spectral distortions
