= Alexander Kompaneyets =

Russian physicist

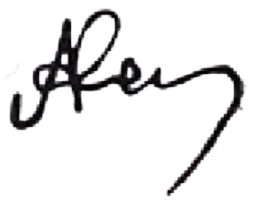
- Born: Alexander Solomonovich Kompaneyets; 4 January 1914; Ekaterinoslav, Russian Empire (now Dnipro, Ukraine)
- Died: 19 August 1974 (aged 60); Palanga, Lithuania
- Education: Kharkiv Institute of Physics and Technology
- Known for: Kompaneyets equation
- Scientific career
- Fields: Physics
- Workplaces: Institute of Chemical Physics
- Thesis: (1936)
- Doctoral advisor: Lev Landau

Alexander Solomonovich Kompaneyets (Russian: Александр Соломонович Компанеец) was born on January 4, 1914, in Ekaterinoslav, Russian Empire (now Dnipro, Ukraine) and died on August 19, 1974, in Palanga, Lithuania. He was a prominent physicist, author of a number of textbooks, and collaborator on the Soviet atomic bomb project who lived mainly in Moscow.

== Biography ==
Kompaneyets was a student of Lev Landau in Kharkiv in the 1930s, where he dealt with solid state physics (electrical conductivity in metals and semiconductors). In 1936 he received his doctorate (candidate title) and habilitated in 1939 (Russian doctorate). He was a professor at the Institute of Chemical Physics at the Russian Academy of Sciences in Moscow (where he worked from 1946 until the end of his life) and is best known for his introductory textbook on theoretical physics. He also dealt with the physics of detonation, which he wrote about in a book with Yakov Zeldovich, and generally about gases at high temperatures.

In 1956, he published a work on the movement of charged particles (electrons) in intense radiation fields (Fokker–Planck equation with inverse Compton scattering (Comptonization), Kompaneyets' equation), which had arisen from secret work in the Soviet atomic bomb project and became important in the 1960s in works by Zeldovich and Rashid Sunyaev on the coupling of radiation and matter in the early universe (see also Sunyaev–Zeldovich effect). In the nuclear weapons program, he worked among others, Zeldovich since the 1940s (at the Institute of Chemical Physics), even at the theoretical examination (from 1948) of the early proposals (1946) of Zeldovich, Isaak Gurevich, Isaac Jakovlevic Pomeranchuk and Yulii Khariton on the hydrogen bomb. Kompaneyets dealt with many areas of theoretical physics, from chemical kinetics to biophysics.

== Publications ==
- Landau, Kompaneyets: The electrical conductivity of metals, 1935
- Kompaneyets: Theoretical Physics, Dover 1962
- Kompaneyets: Theoretical Physics, Geest and Portig Academic Publishing Company 1969
- Kompaneyets: What is Quantum Mechanics?, Academic Publishing Company, Leipzig 1967 and Harri Deutsch, Frankfurt am Main 1967
- Kompaneyets: Statistical Laws in Physics, Leipzig, Teubner 1972
- Zeldovich, Kompaneyets: Theory of Detonation, Moscow 1955, Academic Press 1960
