= Arthur Wolfe =

Arthur Wolfe may refer to:

- Arthur Wolfe, 1st Viscount Kilwarden (1739–1803), Solicitor-General for Ireland
- Arthur M. Wolfe (1939–2014), American astrophysicist
