= Spectral energy distribution =

Plot of energy and frequency or wavelength

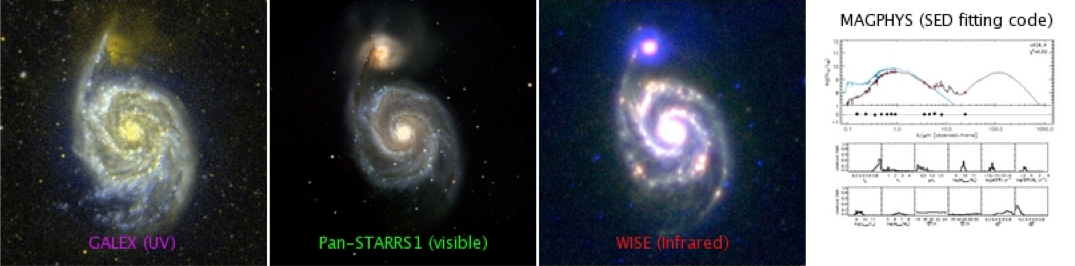
The SED of M51 (upper right) obtained by combining data at many different wavelengths, e.g. UV, visible, and infrared (left)

A spectral energy distribution (SED) is a plot of energy versus frequency or wavelength of electromagnetic or mechanical radiation, most commonly light (not to be confused with a 'spectrum' of flux density vs frequency or wavelength). It is used in many branches of astronomy to characterize astronomical sources. Features of the SED found in specific regions of the electromagnetic spectrum, such as absorption or emission lines, provide information about the object being studied. For example, in radio astronomy they are used to show the emission from synchrotron radiation, free-free emission and other emission mechanisms. In infrared astronomy, SEDs can be used to investigate young stellar objects, galaxies at high redshift, and objects heavily obscured by dust.

== Detector for spectral energy distribution ==
The count rates observed from a given astronomical radiation source have no simple relationship to the flux from that source, such as might be incident at the top of the Earth's atmosphere. This lack of a simple relationship is due in no small part to the complex properties of radiation detectors.

These detector properties can be divided into

- those that merely attenuate the beam, including
  1. residual atmosphere between source and detector,
  2. absorption in the detector window when present,
  3. quantum efficiency of the detecting medium,
- those that redistribute the beam in detected energy, such as
  1. fluorescent photon escape phenomena,
  2. inherent energy resolution of the detector.

The type of detector required to measure a spectral energy distribution changes based on the portion of the electromagnetic spectrum being observed.

== See also ==
- Astronomical radio source
- Astronomical X-ray sources
- Background radiation
- Bremsstrahlung
- Cosmic microwave background spectral distortions
- Cyclotron radiation
- Electromagnetic radiation
- Synchrotron radiation
- Wavelength dispersive X-ray spectroscopy
