= GQ Lupi =

Star in the constellation of Lupus

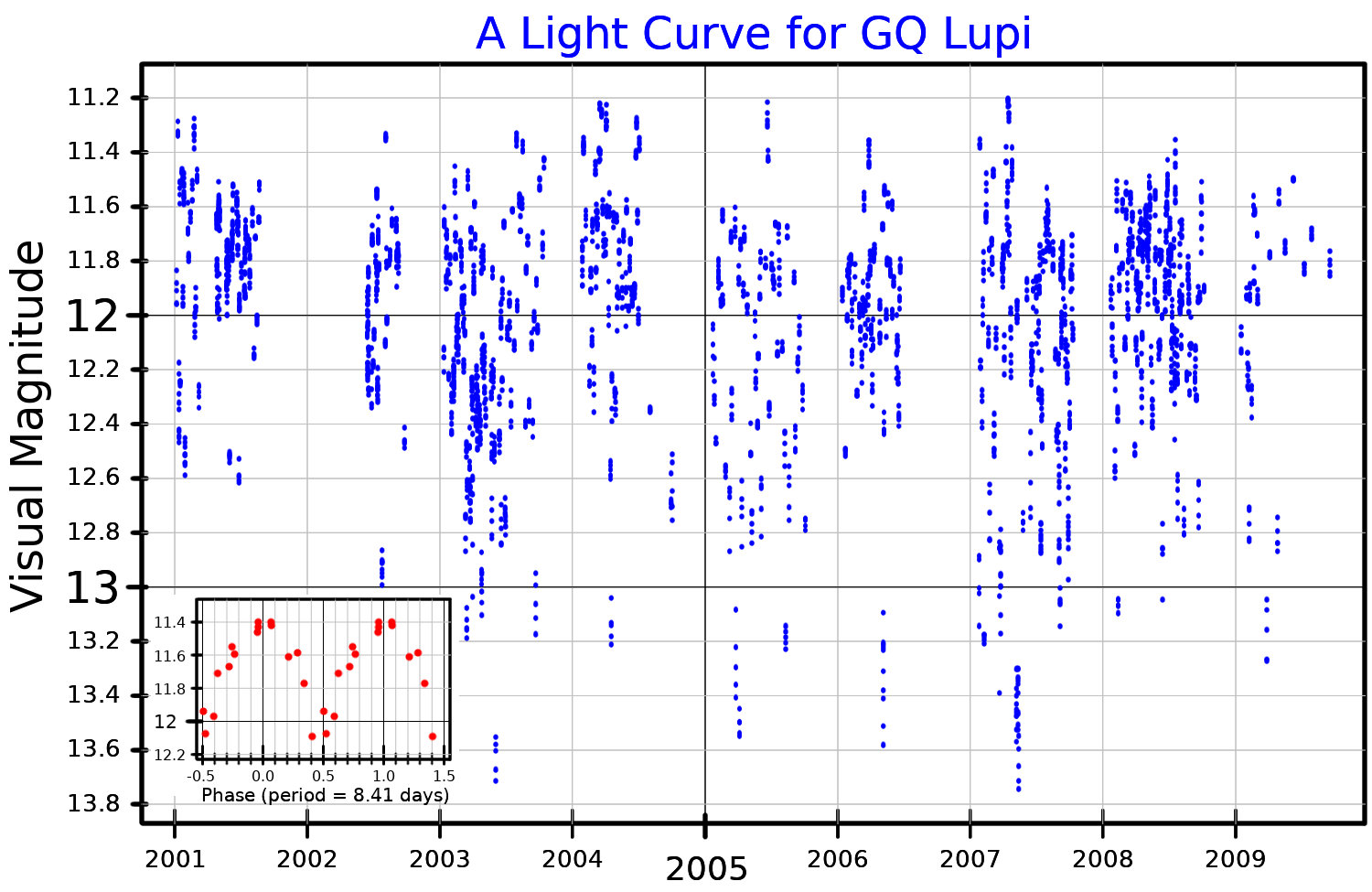
- A visual band light curve for GQ Lupi. The main plot (from ASAS data), shows the long-term variability, and the inset plot (adapted from Broeg et al.) shows the short-term periodic brightness variation.

Observation data Epoch J2000.0 Equinox ICRS
- Constellation: Lupus
- GQ Lupi A
- Right ascension: 15^{h} 49^{m} 12.1054^{s}
- Declination: −35° 39′ 05.058″
- Apparent magnitude (V): 11.3–14.3
- GQ Lupi C
- Right ascension: 15^{h} 49^{m} 13.3078^{s}
- Declination: −35° 39′ 11.761″
- Apparent magnitude (V): 19.72

Characteristics

GQ Lupi A
- Evolutionary stage: Pre-main sequence
- Spectral type: K7Ve
- B−V color index: 0.96
- Variable type: T Tauri variable

GQ Lupi C
- Evolutionary stage: Pre-main sequence
- Spectral type: M4

Astrometry

GQ Lupi A
| Radial velocity (R_{v}) | −3.6±1.3 km/s |
| Proper motion (μ) | RA: −14.133 mas/yr Dec.: −23.329 mas/yr |
| Parallax (π) | 6.4893±0.0289 mas |
| Distance | 503 ± 2 ly (154.1 ± 0.7 pc) |

GQ Lupi C
| Proper motion (μ) | RA: −14.508 mas/yr Dec.: −23.862 mas/yr |
| Parallax (π) | 5.7229±0.3559 mas |
| Distance | 570 ± 40 ly (170 ± 10 pc) |

Position (relative to GQ Lupi A)
| Component | GQ Lupi C |
| Projected separation | 2430 AU |

Details

GQ Lupi A
| Mass | 1.03±0.05 M_{☉} |
| Radius | 1.75+0.06 −0.07 R_{☉} |
| Luminosity | 1.05+0.27 −0.22 L_{☉} |
| Surface gravity (log g) | 3.7 cgs |
| Temperature | 4306±35 K |
| Rotation | 8.45±0.20 days |
| Rotational velocity (v sin i) | 5.66±0.02 km/s |
| Age | 2.8+1.8 −1.1 Myr |

GQ Lupi C
| Mass | 0.15±0.05 M_{☉} |
| Radius | 0.87±0.20 R_{☉} |
| Luminosity | 0.07±0.02 L_{☉} |
| Temperature | 3230±101 K |
| Rotational velocity (v sin i) | 13±6 km/s |

Other designations
- GQ Lup, WDS J15492-3539
- GQ Lupi A: CD−35°10525, 2MASS J15491210-3539051
- GQ Lupi C: 2MASS J15491331-3539118

Database references
| SIMBAD | GQ Lupi A |
| SIMBAD | GQ Lupi C |

GQ Lupi is a possible binary star system in the constellation Lupus. The system is young, with an age of a few million years (for comparison, the Solar System is roughly 4.6 billion years old), and is within the Lupus I star-forming region, which is part of the Scorpius–Centaurus association.

== Stellar system ==
The primary component is designated GQ Lupi A, and was referred to simply as GQ Lupi before the discovery of the secondary stellar companion. It is a T Tauri star, with a variable apparent magnitude ranging from 11.3 at brightest and 14.3 at faintest. The spectral type is K7Ve, with the 'e' indicating emission lines in the spectrum, which in classical T Tauri stars such as GQ Lupi results from an extensive surrounding disk. The star has 1.03 times the mass of the Sun and 1.75 times the Sun's radius, with an effective temperature of 4306 K. Its age is estimated at 2.8+1.8
−1.1 million years. This star is surrounded by a circumstellar disk with a major axis of 59±12 AU.

In 2020, a low-mass companion of GQ Lupi was discovered at a separation of about 16 arcseconds, or 2400 AU. Designated 2MASS J15491331-3539118 in the 2MASS catalogue, it is a young stellar object that is likely gravitationally bound to the primary star, although the low quality of the companion's proper motion and parallax does not allow for a definitive conclusion. It is estimated to be approximately 15% the Sun's mass and 87% the Sun's radius. It has an effective temperature of about 3230 K, indicating that it is a red dwarf with the spectral type M4.

== Substellar companion ==
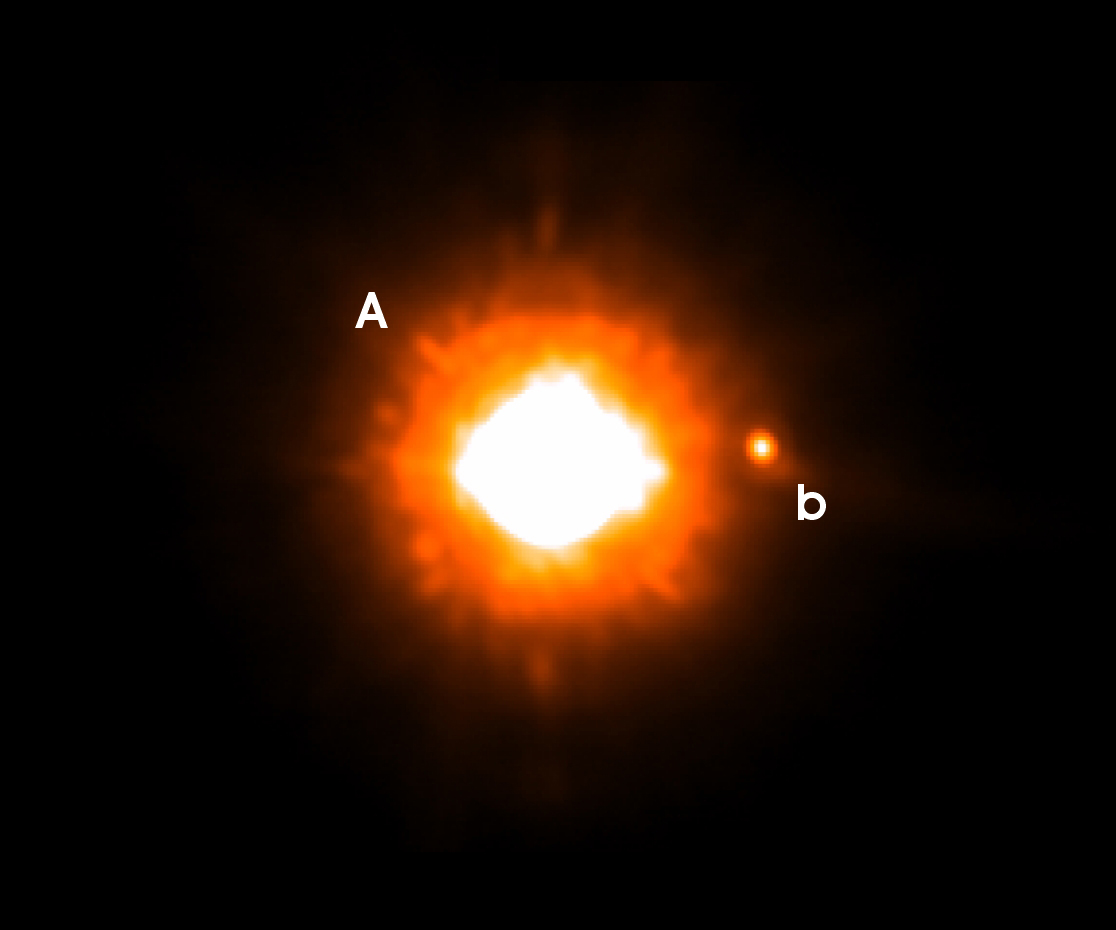
VLT NACO image, taken in the Ks-band, of GQ Lupi. The feeble point of light to the right of the star is the newly found cold companion. It is 250 times fainter than the star itself and it located 0.73 arc second west. At the distance of GQ Lupi, this corresponds to a separation of roughly 100 AU. North is up and East is to the left.

In 2005, Ralph Neuhäuser and his colleagues reported a substellar object, GQ Lupi b, orbiting the star. Along with 2M1207b, this was one of the first extrasolar planet candidates to be directly imaged. The image was made with the VLT telescope at Paranal Observatory, Chile, on June 25, 2004. Depending on its mass and the definition of a planet, GQ Lupi b may or may not be considered a planet. As of 2006, the International Astronomical Union Working Group on Extrasolar Planets described GQ Lupi b as a "possible planetary-mass companion to a young star".

The GQ Lupi planetary system
| Companion (in order from star) | Mass | Semimajor axis (AU) | Orbital period (years) | Eccentricity | Inclination (°) | Radius |
|---|---|---|---|---|---|---|
| b | 30 (10 – 40) M_{J} | 97.7+8.9 −7.1 | 921+159 −124 (Note: Calculated using P^{2} = a^{3} / M_{tot}, where a is the semi-major axis in astronomical units, M_{tot} is the total mass of the system, in M_{☉}, and P is the period in years. Upper error bar calculated with the −7.14 uncertainty in a and +0.07 in M_{tot}. Lower error bar calculated with the +8.92 uncertainty in a and −0.06 in M_{tot}.) | 0.35+0.10 −0.09 | 48+4 −5 | 3.7±0.7 R_{J} |
