= Primordial fluctuations =

Earliest theoretical cosmological structures

Primordial fluctuations are density variations in the early universe which are considered the seeds of all structure in the universe. Currently, the most widely accepted explanation for their origin is in the context of cosmic inflation. According to the inflationary paradigm, the exponential growth of the scale factor during inflation caused quantum fluctuations of the inflaton field to be stretched to macroscopic scales, and, upon leaving the horizon, to "freeze in". At the later stages of radiation- and matter-domination, these fluctuations re-entered the horizon, and thus set the initial conditions for structure formation.

The statistical properties of the primordial fluctuations can be inferred from observations of anisotropies in the cosmic microwave background and from measurements of the distribution of matter, e.g., galaxy redshift surveys. Since the fluctuations are believed to arise from inflation, such measurements can also set constraints on parameters within inflationary theory.

== Formalism ==
Primordial fluctuations are typically quantified by a power spectrum which gives the power of the variations as a function of spatial scale. Within this formalism, one usually considers the fractional energy density of the fluctuations, given by:

$$\delta(\vec{x}) \ \stackrel{\mathrm{def}}{=}\   \frac{\rho(\vec{x})}{\bar{\rho}} - 1 =
\int \text{d}k \; \delta_k \, e^{i\vec{k} \cdot \vec{x}},$$

where $\rho$ is the energy density, $\bar{\rho}$ its average and $k$ the wavenumber of the fluctuations. The power spectrum $\mathcal{P}(k)$ can then be defined via the ensemble average of the Fourier components:

$$\langle \delta_k \delta_{k'} \rangle = \frac{2 \pi^2}{k^3} \, \delta_D(k-k') \, \mathcal{P}(k),$$

where $\delta_D$ is the Dirac delta function and angle brackets denote an ensemble average.

There are both scalar and tensor modes of fluctuations.

=== Scalar modes ===
Scalar modes have the power spectrum defined as the mean squared density fluctuation for a specific wavenumber $k$, i.e., the average fluctuation amplitude at a given scale:

$$\mathcal{P}_\mathrm{s}(k) = \langle\delta_k\rangle^2.$$

Many inflationary models predict that the scalar component of the fluctuations obeys a power law in which

$$\mathcal{P}_\mathrm{s}(k) \propto k^{n_\mathrm{s}}.$$

For scalar fluctuations, $n_\mathrm{s}$ is referred to as the scalar spectral index, with $n_\mathrm{s} = 1$ corresponding to scale invariant fluctuations (not scale invariant in $\delta$ but in the comoving curvature perturbation $\zeta$ for which the power $\mathcal{P}_{\zeta}(k) \propto k^{n_s-1}$ is indeed invariant with $k$ when $n_s=1$).

The scalar spectral index describes how the density fluctuations vary with scale. As the size of these fluctuations depends upon the inflaton's motion when these quantum fluctuations are becoming super-horizon sized, different inflationary potentials predict different spectral indices. These depend upon the slow roll parameters, in particular the gradient and curvature of the potential. In models where the curvature is large and positive $n_s > 1$. On the other hand, models such as monomial potentials predict a red spectral index $n_s < 1$. Planck provides a value of $n_s = 0.968 \pm 0.006$.

=== Tensor modes ===
The presence of primordial tensor fluctuations is predicted by many inflationary models. As with scalar fluctuations, tensor fluctuations are expected to follow a power law and are parameterized by the tensor index (the tensor version of the scalar index). The ratio of the tensor to scalar power spectra is given by

$$r=\frac{2|\delta_h|^2}{|\delta_R|^2},$$

where the 2 arises due to the two polarizations of the tensor modes. 2015 CMB data from the Planck satellite gives a constraint of $r<0.11$.

== Adiabatic/isocurvature fluctuations ==
Adiabatic fluctuations are density variations in all forms of matter and energy which have equal fractional over/under densities in the number density. So for example, an adiabatic photon overdensity of a factor of two in the number density would also correspond to an electron overdensity of two. For isocurvature fluctuations, the number density variations for one component do not necessarily correspond to number density variations in other components. While it is usually assumed that the initial fluctuations are adiabatic, the possibility of isocurvature fluctuations can be considered given current cosmological data. Current cosmic microwave background data favor adiabatic fluctuations and constrain uncorrelated isocurvature cold dark matter modes to be small.

== See also ==
- Big Bang
- Cosmological perturbation theory
- Cosmic microwave background spectral distortions
- Press–Schechter formalism
- Primordial gravitational wave
- Primordial black hole
