= Kompaneyets equation =

Kompaneyets equation refers to a non-relativistic, Fokker–Planck type, kinetic equation for photon number density with which photons interact with an electron gas via Compton scattering, first derived by Alexander Kompaneyets in 1949 and published in 1957 after declassification. The Kompaneyets equation describes how an initial photon distribution relaxes to the equilibrium Bose–Einstein distribution. Kompaneyets pointed out the radiation field on its own cannot reach the equilibrium distribution since the Maxwells equation are linear but it needs to exchange energy with the electron gas. The Kompaneyets equation has been used as a basis for analysis of the Sunyaev–Zeldovich effect.

== Mathematical description ==
Consider a non-relativistic electron bath that is at an equilibrium temperature $T_e$, i.e., $k_B T_e\ll m_e c^2$, where $m_e$ is the electron mass. Let there be a low-frequency radiation field that satisfies the soft-photon approximation, i.e., $\hbar\omega \ll m_ec^2$ where $\omega$ is the photon frequency. Then, the energy exchange in any collision between photon and electron will be small. Assuming homogeneity and isotropy and expanding the collision integral of the Boltzmann equation in terms of small energy exchange, one obtains the Kompaneyets equation.

The Kompaneyets equation for the photon number density $n(\omega,t)$ reads

$$\frac{\partial n}{\partial t} = \frac{\sigma_Tn_e\hbar}{m_ec}\frac{1}{\omega^2}\frac{\partial}{\partial\omega}\left[\omega^4\left(\frac{k_BT_e}{\hbar}\frac{\partial n}{\partial\omega}+ n^2+n\right)\right]$$

where $\sigma_T$ is the total Thomson cross-section and $n_e$ is the electron number density; $\lambda_e = 1/(n_e\sigma_T)$ is the Compton range or the scattering mean free path. As evident, the equation can be written in the form of the continuity equation

$$\frac{\partial n}{\partial t} + \frac{1}{\omega^2}\frac{\partial }{\partial \omega}(\omega^2 j)=0,\quad j =  -\frac{\sigma_Tn_e\hbar}{m_ec}\omega^2\left(\frac{k_BT_e}{\hbar}\frac{\partial n}{\partial\omega}+ n^2+n\right).$$

If we introduce the rescalings

$$\tau = \frac{\sigma_Tn_ek_B T_e}{m_e c} t, \quad x = \frac{\hbar\omega}{k_B T_e}$$

the equation can be brought to the form

$$\frac{\partial n}{\partial \tau} = \frac{1}{x^2}\frac{\partial}{\partial x}\left[x^4\left(\frac{\partial n}{\partial x}+ n^2+n\right)\right].$$

The Kompaneyets equation conserves the photon number

$$N= \frac{Vk_B^3T_e^3}{\pi^2c^3\hbar^3}\int_0^\infty n\,x^2dx$$

where $V$ is a sufficiently large volume, since the energy exchange between photon and electron is small. Furthermore, the equilibrium distribution of the Kompaneyets equation is the Bose–Einstein distribution for the photon gas,

$$n_{\mathrm{eq}} = \frac{1}{e^{x-\mu_0}-1}$$

where $\mu_0=\mu/k_BT_e.$
