= Sunyaev–Zeldovich effect =

Spectral distortion of cosmic microwave background in galaxy clusters

The Sunyaev–Zeldovich effect (named after Rashid Sunyaev and Yakov B. Zeldovich and often abbreviated as the SZ effect) is the spectral distortion of the cosmic microwave background (CMB) through inverse Compton scattering by high-energy electrons in galaxy clusters, in which the low-energy CMB photons receive an average energy boost during collision with the high-energy cluster electrons. Observed distortions of the cosmic microwave background spectrum are used to detect the disturbance of density in the universe. Using the Sunyaev–Zeldovich effect, dense clusters of galaxies have been observed.

== Overview ==
The Sunyaev–Zeldovich effect was predicted by Rashid Sunyaev and Yakov Zeldovich to describe anisotropies in the CMB. The effect is caused by the CMB interacting with high energy electrons. These high energy electrons cause inverse Compton scattering of CMB photons which causes a distortion in the radiation spectrum of the CMB. The Sunyaev–Zeldovich effect is most apparent when observing galactic clusters. Analysis of CMB data at higher angular resolution (high $\ell$-values) requires taking into account the Sunyaev–Zeldovich effect.

The Sunyaev–Zeldovich effect can be divided into different types:

- Thermal effects, where the CMB photons interact with electrons that have high energies due to their temperature
- Kinematic effects, a second-order effect where the CMB photons interact with electrons that have high energies due to their bulk motion (also called the Ostriker–Vishniac effect, after Jeremiah P. Ostriker and Ethan Vishniac.)
- Polarization

The Sunyaev–Zeldovich effect is of major astrophysical and cosmological interest. It can help determine the value of the Hubble constant, determine the location of new galaxy clusters, and in the study of cluster structure and mass. Since the Sunyaev–Zeldovich effect is a scattering effect, its magnitude is independent of redshift, which means that clusters at high redshift can be detected just as easily as those at low redshift.

== Thermal effects ==
The distortion of the CMB resulting from a large number of high energy electrons is known as the thermal Sunyaev–Zeldovich effect. The thermal Sunyaev–Zeldovich effect is most commonly studied in galaxy clusters. By comparing the Sunyaev–Zeldovich effect and X-ray emission data, the thermal structure of the cluster can be studied, and if the temperature profile is known, Sunyaev–Zeldovich data can be used to determine the baryonic mass of the cluster along the line of sight. Comparing Sunyaev–Zeldovich and X-ray data can also be used to determine the Hubble constant using the angular diameter distance of the cluster. These thermal distortions can also be measured in superclusters and in gases in the local group, although they are less significant and more difficult to detect. In superclusters, the effect is not strong (< 8 μK), but with precise enough equipment, measuring this distortion can give a glimpse into large-scale structure formation. Gases in the local group may also cause anisotropies in the CMB due to the thermal Sunyaev–Zeldovich effect which must be taken into account when measuring the CMB for certain angular scales.

== Kinematic effects ==
The kinematic Sunyaev–Zeldovich effect is caused when a galaxy cluster is moving relative to the Hubble flow. The kinematic Sunyaev–Zeldovich effect gives a method for calculating the peculiar velocity:
$$\Delta T_\text{kin} = - T_\text{CMB}\frac {V_p} {c} \tau$$
where $V_p$ is the peculiar velocity, and $\tau$ is the optical depth. In order to use this equation, the thermal and kinematic effects need to be separated. The effect is relatively weak for most galaxy clusters. Using gravitational lensing, the peculiar velocity can be used to determine other velocity components for a specific galaxy cluster. These kinematic effects can be used to determine the Hubble constant and the behavior of clusters.

== Research ==
Current research is focused on modelling how the effect is generated by the intracluster plasma in galaxy clusters, and on using the effect to estimate the Hubble constant and to separate different components in the angular average statistics of fluctuations in the background. Hydrodynamic structure formation simulations are being studied to gain data on thermal and kinetic effects in the theory. Observations are difficult due to the small amplitude of the effect and to confusion with experimental error and other sources of CMB temperature fluctuations. To distinguish the SZ effect due to galaxy clusters from ordinary density perturbations, both the spectral dependence and the spatial dependence of fluctuations in the cosmic microwave background are used.

A factor which facilitates high redshift cluster detection is the angular scale versus redshift relation: it changes little between redshifts of 0.3 and 2, meaning that clusters between these redshifts have similar sizes on the sky. The use of surveys of clusters detected by their Sunyaev–Zeldovich effect for the determination of cosmological parameters has been demonstrated by Barbosa et al. (1996). This might help in understanding the dynamics of dark energy in surveys (South Pole Telescope, Atacama Cosmology Telescope, Planck).

== Observations ==
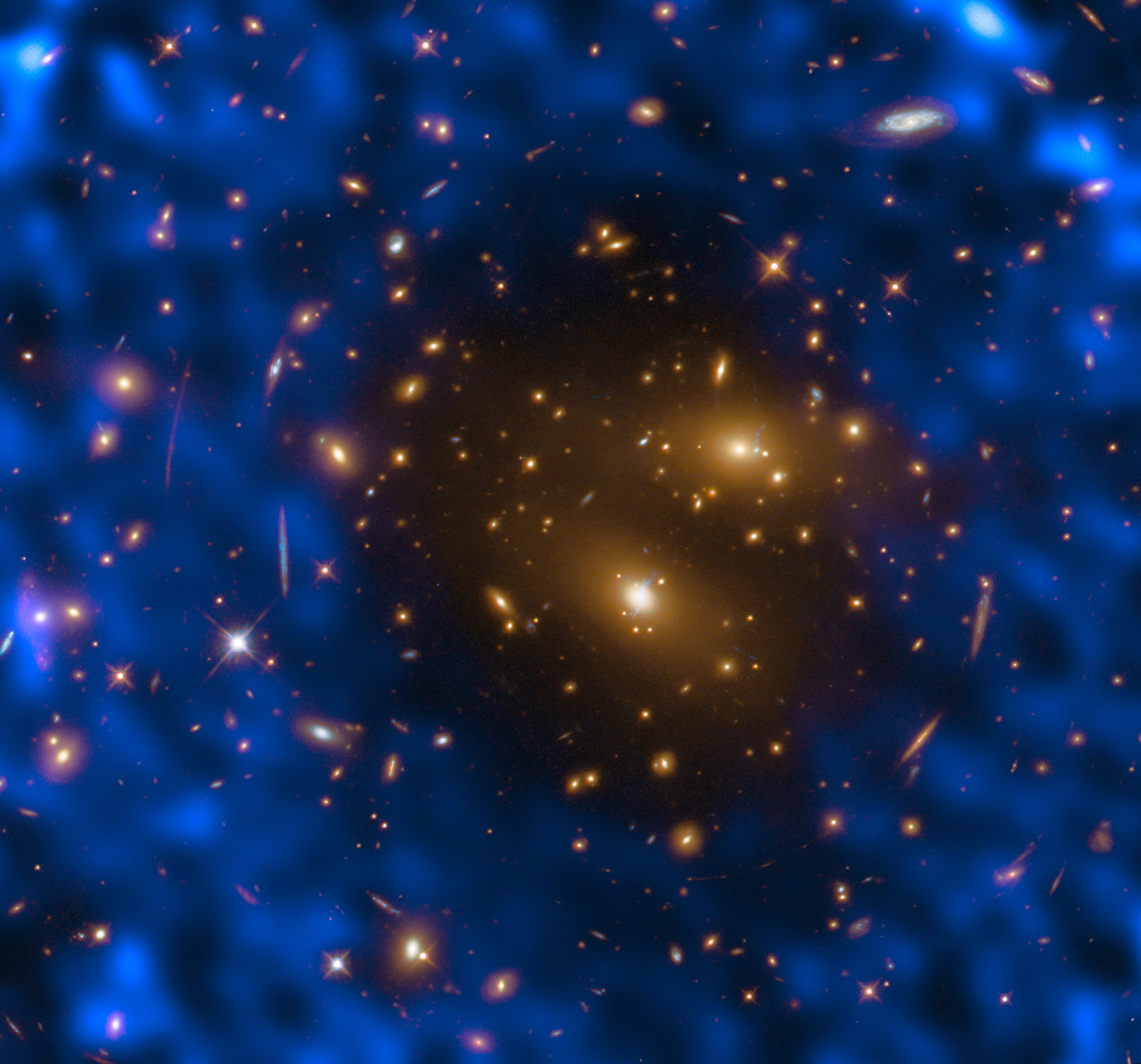
First measurements of the thermal Sunyaev–Zeldovich effect from the Atacama Large Millimeter Array with one of the most massive galaxy clusters known, RX J1347.5-1145.

In 1984, researchers from the Cambridge Radio Astronomy Group and the Owens Valley Radio Observatory first detected the Sunyaev–Zeldovich effect from clusters of galaxies. Ten years later, the Ryle Telescope was used to image a cluster of galaxies in the Sunyaev–Zeldovich effect for the first time.

In 1987 the Cosmic Background Explorer (COBE) satellite observed the CMB and gave more accurate data for anisotropies in the CMB, allowing for more accurate analysis of the Sunyaev–Zeldovich effect.

Instruments built specifically to study the effect include the Sunyaev–Zeldovich camera on the Atacama Pathfinder Experiment, and the Sunyaev–Zeldovich Array, which both saw first light in 2005. In 2012, the Atacama Cosmology Telescope (ACT) performed the first statistical detection of the kinematic SZ effect. In 2012 the kinematic SZ effect was detected in an individual object for the first time in MACS J0717.5+3745.

As of 2015, the South Pole Telescope (SPT) had used the Sunyaev–Zeldovich effect to discover 415 galaxy clusters. The Sunyaev–Zeldovich effect has been and will continue to be an important tool in discovering hundreds of galaxy clusters.

Recent experiments such as the OLIMPO balloon-borne telescope try to collect data in specific frequency bands and specific regions of the sky in order to pinpoint the Sunyaev–Zeldovich effect and give a more accurate map of certain regions of the sky.

== See also ==
- Sachs–Wolfe effect
- Cosmic microwave background spectral distortions
- Kompaneyets equation
