= PG 1543+489 =

Quasar in the constellation of Boötes

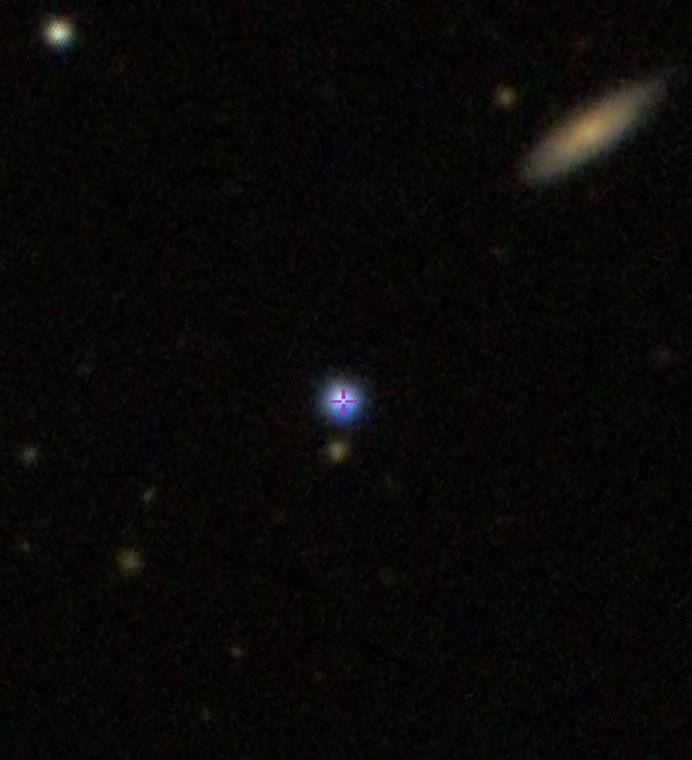
- PG 1543+489 captured by SDSS

Observation data (J2000.0 epoch)
- Constellation: Boötes
- Right ascension: 15h 45m 30.24s
- Declination: +48d 46m 09.07s
- Redshift: 0.399824
- Heliocentric radial velocity: 119,864 km/s
- Distance: 4.559 Gly (1379.8 Mpc)
- Apparent magnitude (V): 0.051
- Apparent magnitude (B): 0.067
- Surface brightness: 16.5

Characteristics
- Type: Spiral; RQQ, AGN
- Notable features: Luminous infrared galaxy, Seyfert galaxy

Other designations
- IRAS F15439+4855, RX J1545.5+4846, PGC 2325245, INTREF 656, 2MASSi J1545302+484609, 2XMM J154530.3+484608, QSO B1544+4855, 1AXG J154530+4845

PG 1543+489, also known as QSO B1544+4855 and PGC 2325245, is a quasar located in the constellation of Boötes. At the redshift of 0.399, the object is located 4.5 billion light-years away from Earth. It was first discovered in 1983, by researchers who presented 114 objects in the Palomar-Green bright quasar survey, as one of the best studied samples of active galactic nuclei (AGN).

== Characteristics ==
The quasar is also classified as a narrow-line Seyfert 1 galaxy, a type of AGN that shows all properties of normal Type 1 Seyfert galaxies but has peculiar characteristics such as narrowest Balmer lines with a full width at half-maximum (FWHM) of 1630 km s^{−1}.

== Observations ==
Researchers also found a peculiar feature in PG 1543+489. The quasar shows a blueshift of the [O III] 5007 Å line that is 1150 km s^{−1} with respect to the systemic velocity of the galaxy as well as the blue asymmetry of its profile. The large [O III] blueshift or so-called 'blue outliers' by researchers, is found theoretically interpreted by the result of intense outflows whose receding parts are obscured by an optically thick accretion disc or possibly a scenario which the narrow-line region clouds are entrained by decelerating winds, potentially associated with the high Eddington ratio typical of the 'blue outliers'.

== Absorption system ==
Through observations from Hubble Space Telescope, researchers were able to find an absorption-line system at z = 0.07489. Looking at it, they found the sightline passes within ρ = 66 kpc of an edge-on 2{L}* disk galaxy at a similar redshift, belonging to four other galaxies in the group within ρ = 160 kpc. From the absorption-line system, they detected H I [log N(H I/cm-2) = 19.12 ± 0.04] as well as N I, Mg II, Si II, and Si III, from which we measure a gas-phase abundance of [N/H] = -1.0 ± 0.1. The photoionization models indicate that the nitrogen-to-silicon relative abundance is solar, yet magnesium is found underabundant by a factor of ≈2. By extracting out its rotational curve and reporting emission-line spectroscopy of the nearby galaxy, researchers suggests the metallicity is ≈8× higher compared to [N/H] in the absorber. Interestingly, the absorber velocities in the galaxy suggests gas at ρ = 66 kpc is corotating with the galaxy's stellar disk, possibly with an inflow component. Although indicating the sub-damped Lyα absorber system is responsible in causing cold accretion flow, the absorber abundance patterns are quite peculiar. Researchers hypothesized gas was probably ejected from its home galaxy or result of tidal debris from interactions between the group galaxies, with solar nitrogen abundance, but mixed with the gas in the circumgalactic medium or group. If the gas is bound to the nearby galaxy, this system may become an example of the gas "recycling" as predicted by theoretical galaxy simulations.
