= Arthur M. Wolfe =

American astrophysicist (1939–2014)

Arthur Michael "Art" Wolfe (29 April 1939 – 17 February 2014) was an American astrophysicist, professor and the former director of the Center for Astrophysics & Space Sciences at the University of California, San Diego. Together with Rainer K. Sachs, he authored the paper describing the Sachs-Wolfe effect.

The disc galaxy DLA0817g is nicknamed the Wolfe Disc in his honor.
