= Peculiar velocity =

Velocity of an object relative to a rest frame

Peculiar velocity or peculiar motion refers to the velocity of an object relative to a rest frame—usually a frame in which the average velocity of some objects is zero.

== Galactic astronomy ==
In galactic astronomy, peculiar motion refers to the motion of an object (usually a star) relative to a Galactic rest frame.

Local objects are commonly examined as to their vectors of position angle and radial velocity. These can be combined through vector addition to state the object's motion relative to the Sun. Velocities for local objects are sometimes reported with respect to the local standard of rest (LSR)—the average local motion of material in the galaxy—instead of the Sun's rest frame. Translating between the LSR and heliocentric rest frames requires the calculation of the Sun's peculiar velocity in the LSR.

== Cosmology ==
In physical cosmology, peculiar velocity refers to the components of a galaxy's velocity that deviate from the Hubble flow. According to Hubble's law, galaxies recede from us at speeds proportional to their distance from us.

Galaxies are not distributed evenly throughout observable space, but are typically found in groups or clusters, where they have a significant gravitational effect one on another. Velocity dispersions of galaxies arising from this gravitational attraction are usually in the hundreds of kilometers per second, but they can rise to over 1000 km/s in rich clusters. Peculiar velocities can also be generated by large-scale structure. This velocity can alter the recessional velocity that would be expected from the Hubble flow and affect the observed redshift of objects via the relativistic Doppler effect. The Doppler redshift due to peculiar velocities is

$$1+z_{\rm pec}=\sqrt{\frac{1+v
_{\rm pec}/c}{1-v_{\rm pec}/c}}$$

which is approximately

$$z_{\rm pec} \approx v_{\rm pec}/c$$

for low velocities (small redshifts). This combines with the redshift from the Hubble flow and the redshift from our own motion $z_\odot$ to give the observed redshift

$$1+z_{\rm obs} = (1+z_{\rm pec})(1+z_{\rm H})(1+z_\odot).$$

(There may also be a gravitational redshift to consider.)

The radial velocity of a cosmologically "close" object can be approximated by

$$v_{\rm r} = H_0 d + v_{\rm pec}$$

with contributions from both the Hubble flow and peculiar velocity terms, where $H_0$ is the Hubble constant and $d$ is the distance to the object.

Redshift-space distortions can cause the spatial distributions of cosmological objects to appear elongated or flattened out, depending on the cause of the peculiar velocities. Elongation, sometimes referred to as the "Fingers of God" effect, is caused by random thermal motion of objects; however, correlated peculiar velocities from gravitational infall are the cause of a flattening effect. The main consequence is that, in determining the distance of a single galaxy, a possible error must be assumed. This error becomes smaller as distance increases. For example, in surveys of type Ia supernovae, peculiar velocities have a significant influence on measurements out to redshifts around 0.5, leading to errors of several percent when calculating cosmological parameters.

Peculiar velocities can also contain useful information about the universe. The connection between correlated peculiar velocities and mass distribution has been suggested as a tool for determining constraints for cosmological parameters using peculiar velocity surveys.

=== Bulk flow ===
The average of the peculiar velocity over a sphere is called the bulk flow. This value can be compared to theories of gravity. Current analysis of experimental bulk flow values are not in good agreement with the Lambda-CDM model.

== See also ==
- Proper motion
- Radial velocity
- Relative velocity
- Space velocity (astronomy)
