= Sachs–Wolfe effect =

Phenomenon of redshift in cosmology

The Sachs–Wolfe effect, named after Rainer K. Sachs and Arthur M. Wolfe, is a property of the cosmic microwave background radiation (CMB) in which photons from the CMB are gravitationally redshifted, causing the CMB spectrum to appear uneven. This effect is the predominant source of fluctuations in the CMB for angular scales larger than about ten degrees.

== Non-integrated Sachs–Wolfe effect ==
The non-integrated Sachs–Wolfe effect is caused by gravitational redshift occurring at the surface of last scattering. The effect is not constant across the sky due to differences in the matter/energy density at the time of last scattering.

== Integrated Sachs–Wolfe effect ==
The integrated Sachs–Wolfe (ISW) effect is also caused by gravitational redshift, but it occurs between the surface of last scattering and the Earth, so it is not part of the primordial CMB. It occurs when the Universe is dominated in its energy density by something other than matter. If the Universe is dominated by matter, then large-scale gravitational potential energy wells and hills do not evolve significantly. If the Universe is dominated by radiation, or by dark energy, though, those potentials do evolve, subtly changing the energy of photons passing through them.

There are two contributions to the ISW effect. The "early-time" ISW occurs immediately after the (non-integrated) Sachs–Wolfe effect produces the primordial CMB, as photons course through density fluctuations while there is still enough radiation around to affect the Universe's expansion. Although it is physically the same as the late-time ISW, for observational purposes it is usually lumped in with the primordial CMB, since the matter fluctuations that cause it are in practice undetectable.

=== Late-time integrated Sachs–Wolfe effect ===
The "late-time" ISW effect arises quite recently in cosmic history, as dark energy, or the cosmological constant, starts to govern the Universe's expansion. Unfortunately, the nomenclature is a bit confusing. Often, "late-time ISW" implicitly refers to the late-time ISW effect to linear/first order in density perturbations. This linear part of the effect entirely vanishes in a flat universe with only matter, but dominates over the higher-order part of the effect in a universe with dark energy. The full nonlinear (linear + higher-order) late-time ISW effect, especially in the case of individual voids and clusters, is sometimes known as the Rees–Sciama effect, since Martin Rees and Dennis Sciama elucidated the following physical picture.

Accelerated expansion due to dark energy causes even strong large-scale potential wells (superclusters) and hills (voids) to decay over the time it takes a photon to travel through them. A photon gets a kick of energy going into a potential well (a supercluster), and it keeps some of that energy after it exits, after the well has been stretched out and shallowed. Similarly, a photon has to expend energy entering a supervoid, but will not get all of it back upon exiting the slightly reduced potential hill.

A signature of the late-time ISW is a non-zero cross-correlation function between the galaxy density (the number of galaxies per square degree) and the temperature of the CMB, because superclusters gently heat photons, while supervoids gently cool them. This correlation has been detected at moderate to high significance.

In May 2008, Granett, Neyrinck & Szapudi showed that the late-time ISW can be pinned to discrete supervoids and superclusters identified in the SDSS Luminous Red Galaxy catalog. Their ISW detection traces the localised ISW effect produced by supervoids and superclusters have on the CMB. However, the amplitude of this localised detection is controversial, as it is significantly larger than the expectations and depends on several assumptions of the analysis.

== See also ==
- Sunyaev–Zeldovich effect
- Cosmic microwave background spectral distortions
