= List of estimates of the age of the universe =

Since the concept of an expanding universe was first introduced, there have been many estimates of the age of the universe that have evolved with scientific discoveries and developments. Many early estimates used the recessional velocities of distant galaxies to calculate the age of the universe, often getting results of about 2 Gyr (2 billion years) or less. Because this was less than calculations of Earth's age at the time, which were considered more accurate, doubt was cast upon the theory of expansion. This problem was resolved in 1952 when Walter Baade discovered that distances to neighboring galaxies, which were being used in the calculation of the age of the universe, were larger than previously thought; this brought the estimated age of the universe to about 4 Gyr.

As time went on and observations improved, estimates for the age of the universe rose, with most estimates in the 1970s through 1990s in the range of 8–20 Gyr. Many of the higher estimates were due to the age of the oldest globular clusters, which had been estimated to be as high as 16 Gyr; these ages were later revised lower after new data revealed that they were further than previously thought.

The launch of the Wilkinson Microwave Anisotropy Probe (WMAP) in 2001 and the Planck spacecraft in 2009, both measuring anisotropies in the cosmic microwave background, allowed astronomers to make more precise measurements of the age of the universe. The first year of WMAP data resulted in an estimated age of 13.7 ± 0.2 Gyr by two independent research groups. As of 2026, the accepted age of the universe is 13.787 ± 0.020 Gyr, based on data from the Planck spacecraft analyzed in 2018.

== List ==
Estimate (Gyr)	Year	Method	Authors	References
10	1922	Mathematical derivation of the Friedmann equations	Alexander Friedmann	
1.8	1929	Recessional velocity, Cepheid variables	Edwin Hubble	
>2×10^{5}	1930	Gravitational collapse of nebulae	James Jeans	
<2	1931	Mathematical derivation from relativity	Arthur Eddington	
1–10	1935	Recessional velocity	Edwin Hubble, Richard Tolman	
5–10×10^{3}	1936	Orbits of binary stars	James Jeans	
0.75–1.5	1937	Recessional velocity, positive cosmological constant	Edwin Hubble	
0.7	1938	Recessional velocity	Paul Dirac	
<1	1942	Recessional velocity	Edwin Hubble	
3.64	1949	Recessional velocity, nonhomogenous cosmology	Guy Omer	
3.5	1952	Revised distance calculations, recessional velocity	Walter Baade	
4.1	1956	Dirac large numbers hypothesis	C. Gilbert	
13.0 ± 4.3	1958	Redshift–magnitude relation	Allan Sandage	
17.7	1972	Cepheid variables	Allan Sandage	
8–18	1974	Oldest globular clusters	Icko Iben Jr.	
13-20	1974	Deuterium-limited density, oldest globular clusters, nucleochronology, galactic evolution	J. Richard Gott, James Gunn, David Schramm, Beatrice Tinsley	
6–20	1977	Nucleochronology, galactic evolution	Kem Hainebach, David Schramm	
13.5–15.5	1978	Oldest globular clusters, nuclear chronology	Demosthenes Kazanas, David Schramm, Kem Hainebach	
12+3 −2	1980–1981	Nuclear chronology	William Alfred Fowler, David Schramm, Sidney van den Bergh	
10.3 ± 2.2	1987	White dwarf luminosity distribution	Don Winget et al.	
13–18	1992	Nucleochronology, oldest globular clusters	Sidney van den Bergh	
>16	1992	RR Lyrae stars, oldest globular clusters	Young-Wook Lee	
>13	1994	Cosmic microwave background anisotropies	Marc Kamionkowski, David Spergel, Naoshi Sugiyama	
≥12.07	1996	Oldest globular clusters	Brian Chaboyer, Pierre Demarque, Peter Kernan, Lawrence Krauss	
9.7–15	1998	Oldest globular clusters	Lawrence Krauss	
≥9.5	1998	Oldest globular clusters	Brian Chaboyer	
13.4 ± 1.6	1999	Literature review	Charles Lineweaver	
<14 ± 2	2000	Literature review	Wendy Freedman	
14.0 ± 0.5	2001	Cosmic microwave background anisotropies	Lloyd Knox, Nelson Christensen, Constantinos Skordis	
13.2+1.2 −0.8	2001	Cluster ellipticals, cosmic microwave background, type Ia supernovae	Ignacio Ferreras, Alessandro Melchiorri, Joseph Silk	
13.7 ± 0.2	2003	Wilkinson Microwave Anisotropy Probe data	David Spergel et al.	
13.7 ± 0.2	2003	Wilkinson Microwave Anisotropy Probe data	Charles Bennett et al.	
13.73+0.16 −0.15	2007	Wilkinson Microwave Anisotropy Probe data	David Spergel et al.	
13.1+0.96 −0.87	2008	Data from Wilkinson Microwave Anisotropy Probe, Sloan Digital Sky Survey, Hubble Space Telescope	Francesco De Bernardis, Alessandro Melchiorri, Licia Verde, Raul Jimenez	
13.31+1.0 −0.91	2008	Data from Wilkinson Microwave Anisotropy Probe, Sloan Digital Sky Survey, Hubble Space Telescope, high-resolution CMB experiments, two degree field galaxy redshift survey, type 1a supernovae	Francesco De Bernardis, Alessandro Melchori, Licia Verde, Raul Jimenez	
13.772 ± 0.059	2013	Wilkinson Microwave Anisotropy Probe data	Charles Bennett et al.	
13.817 ± 0.048	2014	Planck data, WMAP polarization low-multipole likelihood	Planck collaboration	
13.798 ± 0.037	2014	Planck data, WMAP polarization low-multipole likelihood, high-resolution CMB experiments, baryon acoustic oscillation	Planck collaboration	
13.813 ± 0.038	2016	Planck data	Planck collaboration	
13.787 ± 0.020	2020	Planck data	Planck collaboration	

== See also ==
- Age of the universe
- List of measurements of the Hubble constant
- Cosmic age problem
- Lambda-CDM model
- FLRW metric
- BOOMERanG experiment
