= W0410−0913 =

Hyper-luminous galaxy

W0410-0913

Observation data (J2000 epoch)
- Constellation: Eridanus
- Right ascension: 04^{h} 10^{m} 10.60^{s}
- Declination: −09° 13′ 05.2″
- Redshift: 3.59
- Heliocentric radial velocity: 1,076,855 km/s
- Distance: 11.8 billion ly (3.6 billion pc) (light travel distance); 23 billion ly (7.1 billion pc) (present proper distance)

Other designations
- WISE J041010.60-091305.2

W0410-0913 is a hyper-luminous galaxy and an early universe star forming galaxy that is around 12 billion light years (ly) from Earth. W0410-0913 has a swarm of 24 galaxies close to the W0410-0913 galaxy that may activate a quasar. Due to this, it is one of the most massive, brightest and gas rich galaxy in the early universe.
