= Cosmic mass =

Cosmic mass may mean:

- mass of the cosmos, see Mass of the observable universe
  - Cosmic mass distribution, see Cosmic microwave background radiation and Large-scale structure of the cosmos
  - Cosmic mass density, see Shape of the universe
  - Cosmic mass field, see Expansion of the universe
  - Cosmic mass function, see Friedmann equations
- Techno-Cosmic Mass, a religious and musical event, promoted by Matthew Fox
