= Cosmic time =

Time coordinate used in cosmology

Cosmic time, or cosmological time, is the time coordinate used in the Big Bang models of physical cosmology. This concept of time avoids some issues related to relativity by being defined within a solution to the equations of general relativity widely used in cosmology.

== Problems with absolute time ==
Albert Einstein's theory of special relativity showed that simultaneity is not absolute. An observer at rest may believe that two events separated in space (say, two lightning strikes 10 meters apart) occurred at the same time, while another observer in (relative) motion claims that one occurred after the other. This coupling of space and time, Minkowski spacetime, complicates scientific time comparisons: neither observer is an obvious candidate for the time reference.

Einstein's theory of general relativity in an isotropic, homogeneous expanding universe provides a way to define a unique time reference. All coordinate points in such a universe are equivalent. Hermann Weyl postulated that "galaxies" in such a universe define geodesics, generalizations of straight lines in spacetime. Each galaxy represents an area of co-moving masses and gets its own local clock. All of these clocks synchronized at the single point in the past where the geodesics intersect. Hypersurfaces perpendicular to the geodesics become surfaces of constant cosmic time.

Cosmic time provides a universal time only as long as the assumptions used to define it hold. There are solutions to general relativity that do not support cosmic time. However, the standard cosmological theory based on the concepts required for cosmic time has been very successful.

== Definition ==
Cosmic time $t$ is a measure of time by a physical clock with zero peculiar velocity in the absence of matter over-/under-densities (to prevent time dilation due to relativistic effects or confusions caused by expansion of the universe). Unlike other measures of time such as temperature, redshift, particle horizon, or Hubble horizon, the cosmic time (similar and complementary to the co-moving coordinates) is blind to the expansion of the universe.

Cosmic time is the standard time coordinate for specifying the Friedmann–Lemaître–Robertson–Walker solutions of Einstein field equations of general relativity. Such time coordinate may be defined for a homogeneous, expanding universe so that the universe has the same density everywhere at each moment in time (the fact that this is possible means that the universe is, by definition, homogeneous). The clocks measuring cosmic time should move along the Hubble flow.

The $t=0$ doesn't necessarily have to correspond to a physical event (such as the cosmological singularity) but rather it refers to the point at which the scale factor would vanish for a standard cosmological model such as ΛCDM. For technical purposes, concepts such as the average temperature of the universe (in units of eV) or the particle horizon are used when the early universe is the objective of a study since understanding the interaction among particles is more relevant than their time coordinate or age.

Cosmic time relies on physical concepts like mass that may not be valid for times before approximately 10^{−11} seconds.

== Reference point ==
A value of cosmic time at a distant location can be given relative to the current time at our location, called lookback time, or relative the start of the big bang, called the "age of the universe" for that location.

=== Lookback time ===
The lookback time, $t_L$, is an age difference: the age of the universe now, $t_0$, minus the age of the universe when a photon was emitted at a distant location, $t_e.$ The lookback time depends upon the cosmological model:
$$t_L(z) = t_H \int_0^z \frac{dz'}{(1+z')E(z')}$$
where
$$E(z) = \sqrt{\Omega_M(1+z)^3+(1-\Omega_M-\Omega_\Lambda)(1+z)^2+\Omega_\Lambda}$$
and $\Omega_M$ means the present day density parameters for mass and $\Omega_\Lambda$ is the cosmological constant. The lookback time at infinite z is the age of the universe at our location and time. This can be described in terms of the time light has taken to arrive here from a distance object.

=== Age of the universe ===
Alternatively, the Big Bang may be taken as reference to define $t$ as the age of the universe, also known as time since the big bang, at the location of the clock. For an object observed at redshift z, the age of the universe when the observed photons were emitted is:

$$t(z) =  t_H \int_z^\infty  \frac{dz'}{(1+z')E(z')}$$

For every value of redshift, the sum $t_L(z)+t(z)$ equals the age at the universe at our location, $z=0$. The current physical cosmology estimates the present age as 13.8 billion years.

== Relation to redshift ==
Astronomical observations and theoretical models may use redshift as a time-like parameter. Cosmic time and redshift z are related. In case of flat universe without dark energy the cosmic time can expressed as:
$$t(z) \approx \frac {2}{3 H_0 {\Omega_0}^{1/2} } z^{-3/2}\ , \ z \gg 1/\Omega_0.$$
Here $H_0$ is the Hubble constant and $\Omega_0 = \rho/\rho_\text{crit}$ is the density parameter ratio of density of the universe, $\rho(t)$ to the critical density $\rho_c(t)$ for the Friedmann equation for a flat universe:
$$\rho_c(t) = \frac{3H^2(t)}{8\pi G}$$
Uncertainties in the value of these parameters make the time values derived from redshift measurements model dependent.

== See also ==
- Chronology of the universe
- Cosmic Calendar
- Cosmological horizon
