= Comoving and proper distances =

Measurement of distance

In standard cosmology, comoving distance and proper distance (or physical distance) are two closely related distance measures used by cosmologists to define distances between objects. Comoving distance factors out the expansion of the universe, giving a distance that does not change in time except due to local factors, such as the motion of a galaxy within a cluster. Proper distance roughly corresponds to where a distant object would be at a specific moment of cosmic time, which can change over time due to the expansion of the universe. Comoving distance and proper distance are defined to be equal at the present time. At other times, the Universe's expansion results in the proper distance changing, while the comoving distance remains constant.

== Comoving coordinates ==
Although general relativity allows the formulation of the laws of physics using arbitrary coordinates, some coordinate choices are easier to work with. Comoving coordinates are an example of such a coordinate choice. Conceptually, each galaxy in the cosmos becomes a position on the coordinate axis. As the universe expands, this position moves with the expansion.

Comoving coordinates assign constant spatial coordinate values to observers who perceive the universe as isotropic. Such observers are called "comoving" observers because they move along with the Hubble flow. The velocity of an object relative to the local comoving frame is called the peculiar velocity of that object. The peculiar velocity of a photon is always the speed of light.

Most large lumps of matter, such as galaxies, are nearly comoving because their peculiar velocities (caused mostly by gravitational attraction) are small compared to their Hubble-flow velocities seen by observers in moderately nearby galaxies, (i.e. as seen from locations at least outside the group local to the observed "lump of matter").

A comoving observer is the only observer who will perceive the universe, including the cosmic microwave background radiation, to be isotropic. Non-comoving observers will see regions of the sky systematically blue-shifted or red-shifted. Thus, isotropy, particularly isotropy of the cosmic microwave background radiation, defines a special local frame of reference called the comoving frame.

In addition to position, there is a comoving time coordinate, the elapsed time since the Big Bang according to a clock of a comoving observer. The comoving spatial coordinates tell where an event occurs while this cosmological time tells when an event occurs. Together, they form a complete coordinate system, giving both the location and time of an event.

A sphere with one radial coordinate and two angles.

A two-sphere drawn in 3D can be used to envision the concept of comoving coordinates. The surface of the sphere defines a two-dimensional space that is homogeneous and isotropic. The two coordinates in the surface of the sphere are independent of the radius of the sphere: as the sphere expands, these two coordinates are "comoving." If the radius expands over time, any tiny patch of the surface is unaffected, but distant points on the sphere are physically further apart across the surface.

== Comoving distance and proper distance ==
Since comoving galaxies are the tick marks or labels for the comoving coordinate system, the distance between two galaxies denoted in terms of these labels remains constant at all times. This distance is the comoving distance. It is also called the coordinate distance, radial distance, or conformal distance. The physical distance between these galaxies would have been smaller in the past and will become larger in the future due to the expansion of the universe. The conversion factor between a comoving distance and the physical distance in an expanding Universe is called scale factor.

There are different possible concepts for physical distance in spacetime. Distance in spacetime is computed between events along a trajectory light would take, a geodesic. The proper distance is a physical distance computed using the same value of time at each event. This proper distance between two points can be envisioned as the value one would measure with a very long ruler while the expansion of universe was frozen. Since time is fixed, the scale factor is also fixed. This distance measure is also called the instantaneous physical distance.

=== Definitions ===
The comoving distance from an observer to a distant object (e.g. galaxy) can be computed by the following formula (derived using the Friedmann–Lemaître–Robertson–Walker metric):
$$\chi = \int_{t_e}^t c \; \frac{\mathrm{d} t'}{a(t')}$$
where a(t′) is the scale factor, t_{e} is the time of emission of the photons detected by the observer, t is the present time, and c is the speed of light in vacuum.

Despite being an integral over time, this expression gives the correct distance that would be measured by a set of comoving local rulers at fixed time t, i.e. the "proper distance" (as defined below) after accounting for the time-dependent comoving speed of light via the inverse scale factor term $1 / a(t')$ in the integrand. By "comoving speed of light", we mean the velocity of light through comoving coordinates [$c / a(t')$] which is time-dependent even though locally, at any point along the null geodesic of the light particles, an observer in an inertial frame always measures the speed of light as $c$ in accordance with special relativity. For a derivation see "Appendix A: Standard general relativistic definitions of expansion and horizons" from Davis & Lineweaver 2004. In particular, see eqs. 16–22 in the referenced 2004 paper [note: in that paper the scale factor $R(t')$ is defined as a quantity with the dimension of distance while the radial coordinate $\chi$ is dimensionless].

Many textbooks use the symbol $\chi$ for the comoving distance. However, this $\chi$ must be distinguished from the coordinate distance $r$ in the commonly used comoving coordinate system for an FLRW universe where the metric takes the form (in reduced-circumference polar coordinates, which only works half-way around a spherical universe):
$$ds^2 = -c^2 \, d\tau^2 = -c^2 \, dt^2 + a(t)^2 \left( \frac{dr^2}{1 - \kappa r^2} + r^2 \left(d\theta^2 + \sin^2 \theta \, d\phi^2 \right)\right).$$

In this case the comoving coordinate distance $r$ is related to $\chi$ by:
$$\chi = \begin{cases}
|\kappa|^{-1/2}\sinh^{-1} \sqrt{|\kappa|} r , & \text{if } \kappa<0 \ \text{(a negatively curved ‘hyperbolic’ universe)} \\
r, & \text{if } \kappa=0 \ \text{(a spatially flat universe)}  \\
|\kappa|^{-1/2}\sin^{-1}  \sqrt{|\kappa|} r , & \text{if } \kappa>0 \ \text{(a positively curved ‘spherical’ universe)}
\end{cases}$$

Most textbooks and research papers define the comoving distance between comoving observers to be a fixed unchanging quantity independent of time, while calling the dynamic, changing distance between them "proper distance". On this usage, comoving and proper distances are numerically equal at the current age of the universe, but will differ in the past and in the future; if the comoving distance to a galaxy is denoted $\chi$, the proper distance $d(t)$ at an arbitrary time $t$ is simply given by
$$d(t) = a(t) \chi$$
where $a(t)$ is the scale factor (e.g. Davis & Lineweaver 2004). The proper distance $d(t)$ between two galaxies at time t is just the distance that would be measured by rulers between them at that time.

=== Uses of the proper distance ===
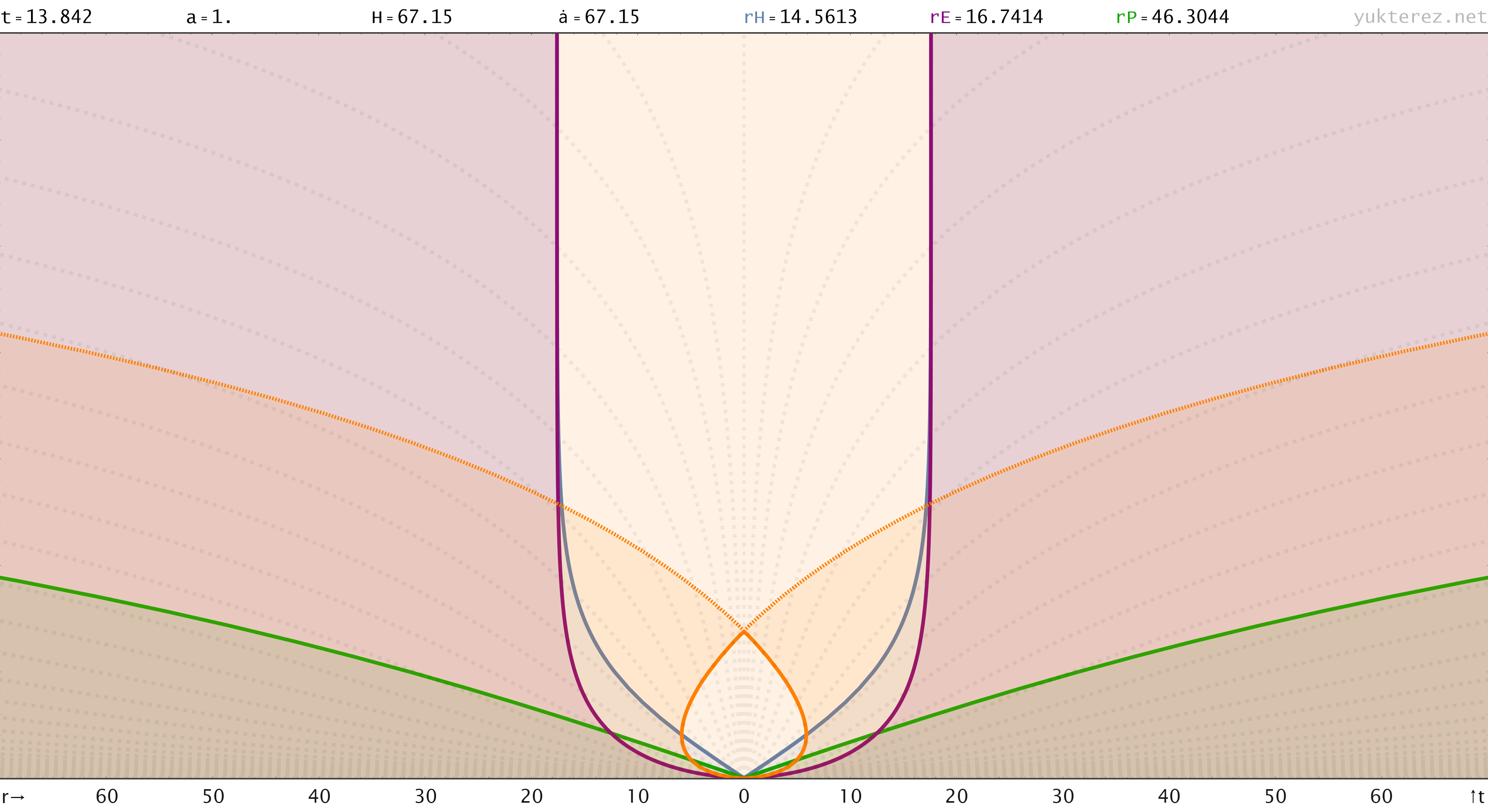
The evolution of the universe and its horizons in proper distances. The x-axis is distance, in billions of light years; the y-axis is time, in billions of years since the Big Bang. This is the same model as in the earlier figure, with dark energy and an event horizon.

Cosmological time is identical to locally measured time for an observer at a fixed comoving spatial position, that is, in the local comoving frame. Proper distance is also equal to the locally measured distance in the comoving frame for nearby objects. To measure the proper distance between two distant objects, one imagines that one has many comoving observers in a straight line between the two objects, so that all of the observers are close to each other, and form a chain between the two distant objects. All of these observers must have the same cosmological time. Each observer measures their distance to the nearest observer in the chain, and the length of the chain, the sum of distances between nearby observers, is the total proper distance.

It is important to the definition of both comoving distance and proper distance in the cosmological sense (as opposed to proper length in special relativity) that all observers have the same cosmological age. For instance, if one measured the distance along a straight line or spacelike geodesic between the two points, observers situated between the two points would have different cosmological ages when the geodesic path crossed their own world lines, so in calculating the distance along this geodesic one would not be correctly measuring comoving distance or cosmological proper distance. Comoving and proper distances are not the same concept of distance as the concept of distance in special relativity. This can be seen by considering the hypothetical case of a universe empty of mass, where both sorts of distance can be measured. When the density of mass in the FLRW metric is set to zero (an empty 'Milne universe'), then the cosmological coordinate system used to write this metric becomes a non-inertial coordinate system in the Minkowski spacetime of special relativity where surfaces of constant Minkowski proper-time τ appear as hyperbolas in the Minkowski diagram from the perspective of an inertial frame of reference. In this case, for two events which are simultaneous according to the cosmological time coordinate, the value of the cosmological proper distance is not equal to the value of the proper length between these same events, which would just be the distance along a straight line between the events in a Minkowski diagram (and a straight line is a geodesic in flat Minkowski spacetime), or the coordinate distance between the events in the inertial frame where they are simultaneous.

If one divides a change in proper distance by the interval of cosmological time where the change was measured (or takes the derivative of proper distance with respect to cosmological time) and calls this a "velocity", then the resulting "velocities" of galaxies or quasars can be above the speed of light, c. Such superluminal expansion is not in conflict with special or general relativity nor the definitions used in physical cosmology. Even light itself does not have a "velocity" of c in this sense; the total velocity of any object can be expressed as the sum $v_\text{tot} = v_\text{rec} + v_\text{pec}$ where $v_\text{rec}$ is the recession velocity due to the expansion of the universe (the velocity given by Hubble's law) and $v_\text{pec}$ is the "peculiar velocity" measured by local observers (with $v_\text{rec} = \dot{a}(t) \chi(t)$ and $v_\text{pec} = a(t) \dot{\chi}(t)$, the dots indicating a first derivative), so for light $v_\text{pec}$ is equal to c (−c if the light is emitted towards our position at the origin and +c if emitted away from us) but the total velocity $v_\text{tot}$ is generally different from c. Even in special relativity the coordinate speed of light is only guaranteed to be c in an inertial frame; in a non-inertial frame the coordinate speed may be different from c. In general relativity no coordinate system on a large region of curved spacetime is "inertial", but in the local neighborhood of any point in curved spacetime we can define a "local inertial frame" in which the local speed of light is c and in which massive objects such as stars and galaxies always have a local speed smaller than c. The cosmological definitions used to define the velocities of distant objects are coordinate-dependent – there is no general coordinate-independent definition of velocity between distant objects in general relativity. How best to describe and popularize that expansion of the universe is (or at least was) very likely proceeding – at the greatest scale – at above the speed of light, has caused a minor amount of controversy. One viewpoint is presented in Davis and Lineweaver, 2004.

=== Short distances vs. long distances ===
Within small distances and short trips, the expansion of the universe during the trip can be ignored. This is because the travel time between any two points for a non-relativistic moving particle will just be the proper distance (that is, the comoving distance measured using the scale factor of the universe at the time of the trip rather than the scale factor "now") between those points divided by the velocity of the particle. If the particle is moving at a relativistic velocity, the usual relativistic corrections for time dilation must be made.

== See also ==
- Distance measure for comparison with other distance measures.
- Expansion of the universe
- Faster-than-light § Cosmic expansion, for the apparent faster-than-light movement of distant galaxies.
- Friedmann–Lemaître–Robertson–Walker metric
- Proper length
- Redshift, for the link between comoving distance to redshift.
- Shape of the universe
