= Age of the universe =

Cosmological time duration

In Big Bang models of physical cosmology, the age of the universe is the cosmological time back to the point when the scale factor of the universe extrapolates to zero. Using the latest models and the data from the Planck project, the age of the universe is 13.8 billion years. Astronomers have two different approaches to determine the age of the universe. One is based on a particle physics model of the early universe called Lambda-CDM, matched to measurements of features from very early in the history of the universe, like the cosmic microwave background. The other is based on the distance and relative velocity of a series or "ladder" of different kinds of stars, making it depend on local measurements late in the history of the universe. These two methods give slightly different values for the Hubble constant, which is then used in a formula to calculate the age. The range of the estimate is also within the range of the estimate for the oldest observed star in the universe.

== History ==
Nature timeline
← / Earliest stars; ← / Earliest galaxy; ← / Earliest quasar / black hole; ← / Omega Centauri; ← / Andromeda Galaxy; ← / Milky Way spirals; ← / NGC 188 star cluster; ← / Alpha Centauri; ← / Accelerated expansion; ← / Earth / Solar System; ← / Earliest known life; ← / Atmospheric oxygen; ← / Sexual reproduction; ← / Earliest fungi; ← / Earliest land plants; ← / Cambrian explosion; ← / Earliest mammals; ← / Earliest apes / humans
(billion years ago)

In the 18th century, the concept that the age of Earth was millions, if not billions, of years began to appear. Nonetheless, most scientists throughout the 19th century and into the first decades of the 20th century presumed that the universe itself was steady state and eternal, possibly with stars coming and going but no changes occurring at the largest scale known at the time.

The first scientific theories indicating that the age of the universe might be finite were the studies of thermodynamics, formalized in the mid-19th century. The concept of entropy dictates that if the universe (or any other closed system) were infinitely old, then everything inside would be at the same temperature, and thus there would be no stars and no life. No scientific explanation for this contradiction was put forth at the time.

In 1915, Albert Einstein published the theory of general relativity and in 1917 constructed the first cosmological model based on his theory. In order to remain consistent with a steady-state universe, Einstein added what was later called a cosmological constant to his equations. Einstein's model of a static universe was proved unstable by Arthur Eddington.

The first direct observational hint that the universe was not static but expanding came from the observations of 'recession velocities', mostly by Vesto M. Slipher, combined with distances to the 'nebulae' (galaxies) by Edwin Hubble in a work published in 1929. Earlier in the 20th century, Hubble and others resolved individual stars within certain nebulae, thus determining that they were galaxies, similar to, but external to, the Milky Way Galaxy. In addition, these galaxies were very large and very far away. Spectra taken of these distant galaxies showed a red shift in their spectral lines presumably caused by the Doppler effect, thus indicating that these galaxies were moving away from the Earth. In addition, the farther away these galaxies seemed to be (the dimmer they appeared) the greater was their redshift, and thus the faster they seemed to be moving away. This was the first direct evidence that the universe is not static but expanding. The first estimate of the age of the universe came from the calculation of when all of the objects must have started speeding out from the same point. Hubble's initial value for the universe's age was very low, as the galaxies were assumed to be much closer than later observations found them to be.

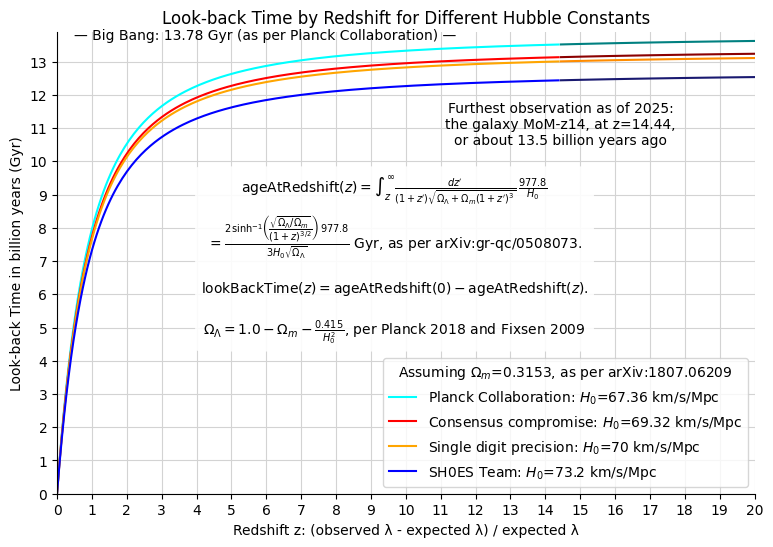
The lookback time of extragalactic observations by their redshift up to z = 20

The first reasonably accurate measurement of the rate of expansion of the universe, the Hubble constant, was made in 1958 by astronomer Allan Sandage. His measured value for the Hubble constant came very close to the value range generally accepted since then.

Sandage, like Einstein, did not believe his own results at the time of discovery. Sandage proposed new theories of cosmogony to explain this discrepancy. This issue was more or less resolved by improvements in the theoretical models used for estimating the ages of stars. As of 2021, using the latest models for stellar evolution applied to the oldest known stars gives estimated ages of 14.27±0.80 billion years (Methuselah star) and 13.8±4 billion years (BD +17°3248). Both values are compatible with the Planck 2018 number.

The discovery of cosmic microwave background radiation announced in 1965 finally brought an effective end to the remaining scientific uncertainty over the expanding universe. It was a chance result from work by two teams less than 60 miles apart. In 1964, Arno Penzias and Robert Woodrow Wilson were trying to detect radio wave echoes with a supersensitive antenna. The antenna persistently detected a low, steady, mysterious noise in the microwave region that was evenly spread over the sky, and was present day and night. After testing, they became certain that the signal did not come from the Earth, the Sun, or the Milky Way galaxy, but from outside the Milky Way, but could not explain it. At the same time another team, Robert H. Dicke, Jim Peebles, and David Wilkinson, were attempting to detect low level noise that might be left over from the Big Bang and could prove whether the Big Bang theory was correct. The two teams realized that the detected noise was in fact radiation left over from the Big Bang, and that this was strong evidence that the theory was correct. Since then, a great deal of other evidence has strengthened and confirmed this conclusion, and refined the estimated age of the universe.

The space probes WMAP, launched in 2001, and Planck, launched in 2009, produced data that determines the Hubble constant and the age of the universe independent of galaxy distances, removing the largest source of error.

== Definition ==
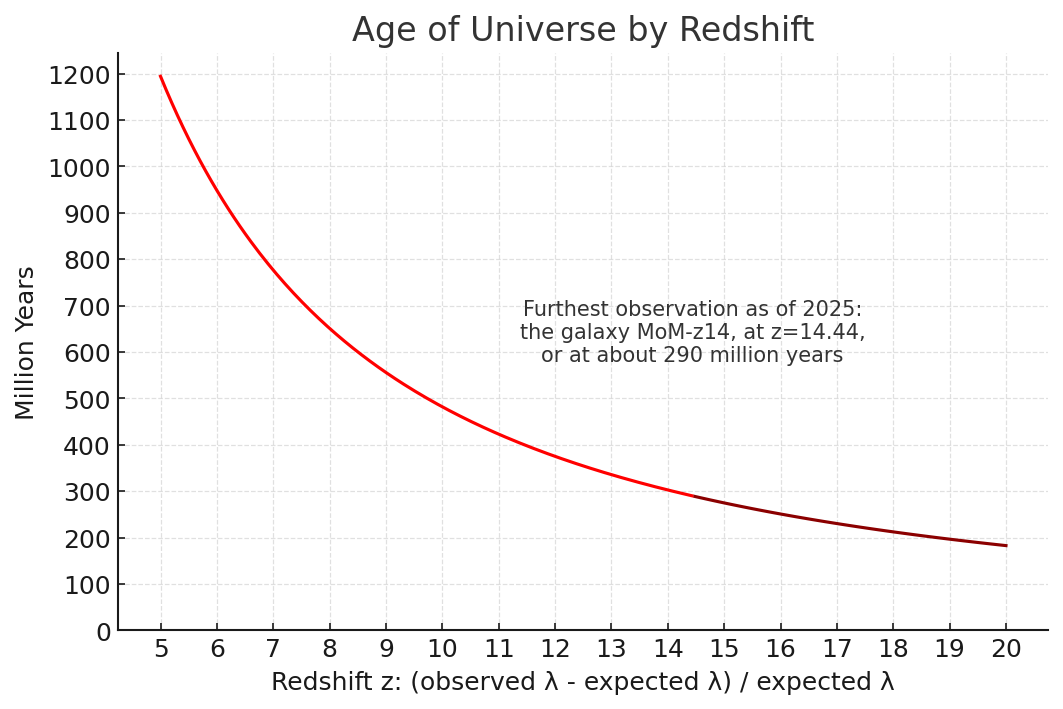
Relationship between redshift and age of the universe, from z = [5, 20]

Experimental observations confirm expansion of the universe according to Hubble's law. Since the universe is expanding, the equation for that expansion can be "run backwards" to its starting point. The Lambda-CDM concordance model describes the expansion of the universe from a very uniform, hot, dense primordial state to its existing state over a span of about 13.8 billion years of cosmological time. This model is well understood theoretically and strongly supported by recent high-precision astronomical observations such as WMAP. The International Astronomical Union uses the term "age of the universe" to mean the duration of the Lambda-CDM expansion, or equivalently, the time elapsed within the observable universe since the Big Bang. The expansion rate at any time $t$ is called the Hubble parameter
$$H(t) \equiv \frac{\dot a}{a},$$
which is modeled as
$$H(a) \equiv \frac{\dot{a}}{a} = H_0 \sqrt{ \Omega_{\rm m}  a^{-3} + \Omega_\mathrm{rad} a^{-4} + \Omega_{\Lambda} + (1- \Omega_{\rm m} - \Omega_\mathrm{rad} -  \Omega_{\Lambda} )a^{-2}} ,$$
where $\Omega_x$ are density parameters, with $\mathrm m$ for mass (baryons and cold dark matter), $\mathrm{rad}$ for radiation (photons plus relativistic neutrinos), and $\Lambda$ for dark energy. The value $H_0$, called the Hubble constant, is the Hubble parameter ($t=0$) and it has units of inverse time. The age of the universe is then defined as
$$t_\textrm{age} = \frac{1}{H_0} \int_0^1  \frac{da}{\sqrt{ \Omega_{\rm m}  a^{-1} + \Omega_\mathrm{rad} a^{-2} + \Omega_{\Lambda} a^{2} + (1- \Omega_{\rm m} - \Omega_\mathrm{rad} -  \Omega_{\Lambda} )}} ,$$
The integral is close to 1 so $H_0^{-1}$ is close to the age of the universe.

== Observational limits ==
Since the universe must be at least as old as the oldest things in it, there are a number of observations that put a lower limit on the age of the universe; these include

- the temperature of the coolest white dwarfs, which gradually cool as they age, and
- the dimmest turnoff point of main sequence stars in clusters (lower-mass stars spend a greater amount of time on the main sequence, so the lowest-mass stars that have evolved away from the main sequence set a minimum age).

Before the incorporation of dark energy in the model of cosmic expansion, the age was awkwardly less than the oldest observed astronomical objects. This connection can be used in reverse: the oldest objects found constrain the values of the density parameter for dark energy.

== Cosmological parameters ==
The age of the universe can be determined by measuring the Hubble constant and extrapolating back in time with the observed value of density parameters ($~\Omega~$). Before the discovery of dark energy, it was believed that the universe was matter-dominated (Einstein–de Sitter universe, green curve). The de Sitter universe has infinite age, while the closed universe has the least age.

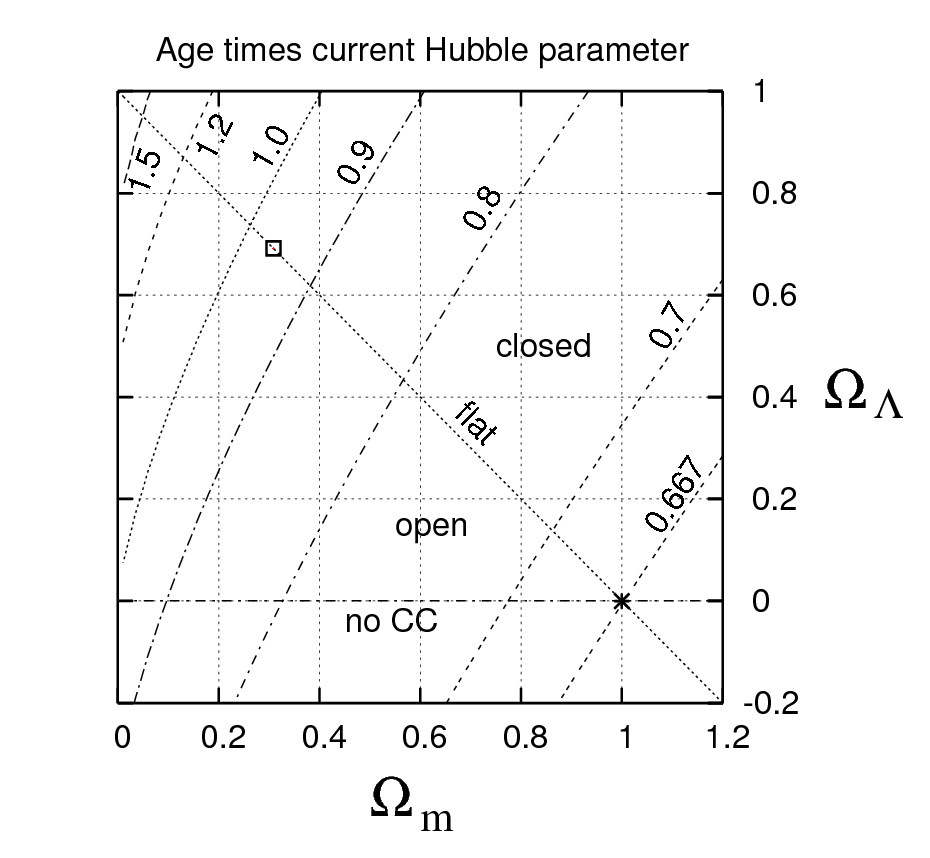
The value of the age correction factor, $~F~,$ is shown as a function of two cosmological parameters: the fractional matter density $~\Omega_\text{m}~$ and cosmological constant density $~\Omega_\Lambda~.$ The best-fit values of these parameters are shown by the box in the upper left; the matter-dominated universe is shown by the star in the lower right.

The problem of determining the age of the universe is closely tied to the problem of determining the values of the cosmological parameters. This is largely carried out in the context of the ΛCDM model, where the universe is assumed to contain normal (baryonic) matter, cold dark matter, radiation (including both photons and neutrinos), and a cosmological constant.

The fractional contribution of each to the energy density of the universe is given by the density parameters$~\Omega_\text{m}~,$ $~\Omega_\text{r}~,$ and $~\Omega_\Lambda~.$ The full ΛCDM model is described by a number of other parameters, but for the purpose of computing its age these three, along with the Hubble parameter$~H_0~$, are the most important.

With accurate measurements of these parameters, the age of the universe can be determined by using the Friedmann equation. This equation relates the rate of change in the scale factor$~a(t)~$to the matter content of the universe. Turning this relation around, we can calculate the change in time per change in scale factor and thus calculate the total age of the universe by integrating this formula. The age$~t_0~$is then given by an expression of the form

$$t_0 = \frac{1}{H_0} \, F (\,\Omega_\text{r},\,\Omega_\text{m},\,\Omega_\Lambda,\,\dots\,)~$$

where$~H_0~$is the Hubble parameter and the function$~F~$depends only on the fractional contribution to the universe's energy content that comes from various components. The first observation that one can make from this formula is that it is the Hubble parameter that controls the age of the universe, with a correction arising from the matter and energy content. So a rough estimate of the age of the universe comes from the Hubble time, the inverse of the Hubble parameter. With a value for$~H_0~$around 69 km/s/Mpc, the Hubble time evaluates to $~1/H_0 =~$14.5 billion years.

To get a more accurate number, the correction function$~F~$must be computed. In general this must be done numerically, and the results for a range of cosmological parameter values are shown in the figure. For the Planck values$~(\Omega_\text{m}, \Omega_\Lambda) =~$(0.3086, 0.6914), shown by the box in the upper left corner of the figure, this correction factor is about$~F = 0.956 ~.$ For a flat universe without any cosmological constant, shown by the star in the lower right corner,$~F = {2}/{3}~$is much smaller and thus the universe is younger for a fixed value of the Hubble parameter. To make this figure,$~\Omega_\text{r}~$is held constant (roughly equivalent to holding the cosmic microwave background temperature constant) and the curvature density parameter is fixed by the value of the other three.

Apart from the Planck satellite, the Wilkinson Microwave Anisotropy Probe (WMAP) was instrumental in establishing an accurate age of the universe, though other measurements must be folded in to gain an accurate number. CMB measurements are very good at constraining the matter content$~\Omega_\text{m}~,$ and curvature parameter $~\Omega_\text{k}~.$ It is not as sensitive to$~\Omega_\Lambda~$directly, partly because the cosmological constant becomes important only at low redshift. The most accurate determinations of the Hubble parameter$~H_0~$are believed to come from measured brightnesses and redshifts of distant Type Ia supernovae. Combining these measurements leads to the generally accepted value for the age of the universe quoted above.

The cosmological constant makes the universe "older" for fixed values of the other parameters. This is significant, since before the cosmological constant became generally accepted, the Big Bang model had difficulty explaining why globular clusters in the Milky Way appeared to be far older than the age of the universe as calculated from the Hubble parameter and a matter-only universe. Introducing the cosmological constant allows the universe to be older than these clusters, as well as explaining other features that the matter-only cosmological model could not.

== Lookback time ==
Light observed from astronomical objects was emitted when the universe was younger. Astronomers use lookback time, $t_L$, to describe the difference in the age of the universe here and now, $t_0$, from the age at the time of emission, $t_e$:
$$t_L(z) = t_0 - t_e(z)$$
where t is an age. The lookback time depends on the object's redshift and, like the age of the universe, the cosmological parameters selected.

== WMAP ==
NASA's Wilkinson Microwave Anisotropy Probe (WMAP) project's nine-year data release in 2012 estimated the age of the universe to be (13.772±0.059)×10^{9} years (13.772 billion years, with an uncertainty of plus or minus 59 million years).

This age is based on the assumption that the project's underlying model is correct; other methods of estimating the age of the universe could give different ages. Assuming an extra background of relativistic particles, for example, can enlarge the error bars of the WMAP constraint by one order of magnitude.

This measurement is made by using the location of the first acoustic peak in the microwave background power spectrum to determine the size of the decoupling surface (size of the universe at the time of recombination). The light travel time to this surface (depending on the geometry used) yields a reliable age for the universe. Assuming the validity of the models used to determine this age, the residual accuracy yields a margin of error near one per cent.

== Planck ==
In 2015, the Planck Collaboration estimated the age of the universe to be 13.813±0.038 billion years, slightly higher but within the uncertainties of the earlier number derived from the WMAP data. In 2018, the Planck Collaboration updated its estimate for the age of the universe to 13.8 billion years.

== Assumption of strong priors ==
Calculating the age of the universe is accurate only if the assumptions built into the models being used to estimate it are also accurate. This is referred to as strong priors and essentially involves stripping the potential errors in other parts of the model to render the accuracy of actual observational data directly into the concluded result. The age given is thus accurate to the specified error, since this represents the error in the instrument used to gather the raw data input into the model.

The age of the universe based on the best fit to Planck 2018 data alone is 13.8 billion years. A component to the analysis of data used to determine the age of the universe (e.g. from Planck) is to use a Bayesian statistical analysis, which normalizes the results based upon the priors (i.e. the model). This quantifies any uncertainty in the accuracy of a measurement due to a particular model used.

== See also ==
- Age of Earth – Scientific dating of the Earth
- Anthropic principle – Hypothesis about sapient life and the universe
- Cosmic Calendar – Method to visualize the chronology of the universe (age of the universe scaled to a single year)
- Dark Ages Radio Explorer – Proposed concept lunar orbiter
- Expansion of the universe – Increase in distance between parts of the universe
- Hubble Deep Field – Multiple exposure image of deep space in the constellation Ursa Major
- Illustris project – Computer-simulated universes
- List of age estimates of the universe
- James Webb Space Telescope – NASA/ESA/CSA space infrared telescope launched in 2021
- Multiverse – Hypothetical group of multiple universes
- Observable universe – All of space observable from the Earth at the present
- Observational cosmology – Study of the origin of the universe (structure and evolution)
- Redshift observations in astronomy – Change in wavelength of light
- Static universe – Cosmological model in which the universe does not expand
- The First Three Minutes – 1977 book by Steven Weinberg
- Timeline of the far future – Scientific projections regarding the far future
