= Scale factor (cosmology) =

Expansion of the universe parameter

The expansion of the universe is parametrized by a dimensionless scale factor $a$. Also known as the cosmic scale factor or sometimes the Robertson–Walker scale factor, this is a key parameter of the Friedmann equations.

In the early stages of the Big Bang, most of the energy was in the form of radiation, and that radiation was the dominant influence on the expansion of the universe. Later, with cooling from the expansion the roles of matter and radiation changed and the universe entered a matter-dominated era. Recent results suggest that we have already entered an era dominated by dark energy, but examination of the roles of matter and radiation are most important for understanding the early universe.

Using the dimensionless scale factor to characterize the expansion of the universe, the effective energy densities of radiation and matter scale differently. This leads to a radiation-dominated era in the very early universe but a transition to a matter-dominated era at a later time and, since about 4 billion years ago, a subsequent dark-energy–dominated era.

== Concept ==
Three galaxies at scale factor 1 and scale factor 0.5.

The scale factor in cosmology is a geometrical scaling factor that tracks relative expansion. For three galaxies, their relative positions, $r_{ij}$, over time are related through the scale factor $a(t)$:
$$r_{12}(t) = a(t)r_{12}(t_0), r_{23}(t) = a(t)r_{23}(t_0), r_{31}(t) = a(t)r_{31}(t_0).$$
where the scale factor of 1.0 represents the present time ("now" or $t_0$). Thus the scale factor relates distances at any time $t$ to the distances today:
$$a(t) = r_{12}(t)/r_{12}(t_0)$$
and similarly for any other distance.

The scale factor can be introduced by writing the line element of spacetime, $ds^2$, as the sum of a time part and a scaled space part, $dl^2$:
$$ds^2 = -c^2dt^2 + a^2(t) dl^2$$
In a homogeneous and isotropic universe, the ten parameter spatial part from general relativity can be simplified to the Friedmann–Lemaître–Robertson–Walker metric form:
$$ds^2 = c^2 dt^2 - a^2(t)\left( \frac{dr^2}{1 - kr^2/R_0^2} + r^2 d\psi^2\right)$$

where $\psi$ is the angle between the two locations. In this equation we can select $a(t_0)=1.0$, making $R_0$ with current radius of curvature of the universe. The parameter $k$ is zero in a flat universe.

Models of the universe specify the value of the scale factor as a function of cosmic time. At earlier times the factor is less than one. The scale factor is independent of location and direction.

The scale factor is dimensionless, with $t$ counted from the birth of the universe and $t_0$ set to the present age of the universe: 13.799±0.021 Gyr giving the current value of $a$ as $a(t_0)$ or $1$.

== Relation to Hubble's law ==
The Hubble parameter is defined as:

$$H(t) \equiv \frac{\dot{a}(t)}{a(t)}$$

where the dot represents a time derivative. The Hubble parameter varies with time, not with space, with the Hubble constant $H_0$ being its current value.

Writing any distance $d(t) = d_0 a(t)$ and taking the time derivative gives $\dot{d}(t) = d_0 \dot{a}(t)$. Replacing $d_0 = \frac{d(t)}{a(t)}$, gives $\dot{d}(t) = \frac{d(t) \dot{a}(t)}{a(t)}$, and substituting the above definition of the Hubble parameter gives Hubble's law, $\dot{d}(t) = H(t) d(t)$.

Current evidence suggests that the expansion of the universe is accelerating, which means that the second derivative of the scale factor $\ddot{a}(t)$ is positive, or equivalently that the first derivative $\dot{a}(t)$ is increasing over time. This also implies that any given galaxy recedes from us with increasing speed over time, i.e. for that galaxy $\dot{d}(t)$ is increasing with time. In contrast, the Hubble parameter seems to be decreasing with time, meaning that if we were to look at some fixed distance d and watch a series of different galaxies pass that distance, later galaxies would pass that distance at a smaller velocity than earlier ones.

== Relationship to redshift ==
According to the Friedmann–Lemaître–Robertson–Walker metric which is used to model the expanding universe, if at present time we receive light from a distant object with a redshift of z, then the scale factor at the time the object originally emitted that light is
$$a(t) = \frac{1}{1 + z}.$$

== Chronology ==
Qualitatively, the scale factor of the universe had three different dependencies on time. During each era the scale factor responded to the dominant energy form.

=== Radiation-dominated era ===
After Inflation, and until about 47,000 years after the Big Bang, the dynamics of the early universe were set by radiation (referring generally to the constituents of the universe which moved relativistically, principally photons and neutrinos).

For a radiation-dominated universe the evolution of the scale factor in the Friedmann–Lemaître–Robertson–Walker metric is obtained solving the Friedmann equations:
$$a(t) \propto t^{1/2}.$$

=== Matter-dominated era ===
Between about 47,000 years and 9.8 billion years after the Big Bang, the energy density of matter exceeded both the energy density of radiation and the vacuum energy density.

When the early universe was about 47,000 years old (redshift 3600), mass–energy density surpassed the radiation energy, although the universe remained optically thick to radiation until the universe was about 378,000 years old (redshift 1100). This second moment in time (close to the time of recombination), at which the photons which compose the cosmic microwave background radiation were last scattered, is often mistaken as marking the end of the radiation era.

For a matter-dominated universe the evolution of the scale factor in the Friedmann–Lemaître–Robertson–Walker metric is obtained solving the Friedmann equations:
$$a(t) \propto t^{2/3}$$

=== Dark energy–dominated era ===
In physical cosmology, the dark energy–dominated era is proposed as the last of the three phases of the known universe, beginning when the Universe was about 9.8 billion years old. In the era of cosmic inflation, the Hubble parameter is also thought to be constant, so the expansion law of the dark energy–dominated era also holds for the inflationary prequel of the big bang.

The cosmological constant is given the symbol Λ, and, considered as a source term in the Einstein field equation, can be viewed as equivalent to a "mass" of empty space, or dark energy. Since this increases with the volume of the universe, the expansion pressure is effectively constant, independent of the scale of the universe, while the other terms decrease with time. Thus, as the density of other forms of matter – dust and radiation – drops to very low concentrations, the cosmological constant (or "dark energy") term will eventually dominate the energy density of the Universe. Recent measurements of the change in Hubble constant with time, based on observations of distant supernovae, show this acceleration in expansion rate, indicating the presence of such dark energy.

For a dark energy–dominated universe, the evolution of the scale factor in the Friedmann–Lemaître–Robertson–Walker metric is easily obtained solving the Friedmann equations:
$$a(t) \propto \exp(H_0t)$$
Here, the coefficient $H_0$in the exponential, the Hubble constant, is
$$H_0 = \sqrt{8\pi G \rho_\mathrm{full} / 3} = \sqrt{\Lambda / 3}.$$
This exponential dependence on time makes the spacetime geometry identical to the de Sitter universe, and only holds for a positive sign of the cosmological constant, which is the case according to the currently accepted value of the cosmological constant, Λ, that is approximately 2×10^{−35} s^{−2}. The current density of the observable universe is of the order of 9.44×10^{−27} kg/m^{3} and the age of the universe is of the order of 13.8 billion years, or 4.358×10^{17} s. The Hubble constant, $H_0$, is ≈70.88 km/s/Mpc

== See also ==
- Cosmological principle
- Lambda-CDM model
- Redshift
