= Shape of the universe =

Local and global geometry of the universe

In physical cosmology, the shape of the universe refers to both its local geometry and cosmic topology. Local geometry is defined primarily by its curvature, general relativity explains how spatial curvature (local geometry) is constrained by gravity. The cosmological topology of the universe cannot be deduced from measurements of curvature inferred from observations within the family of homogeneous general relativistic models alone, due to the existence of locally indistinguishable spaces with varying global topological characteristics. For example, a multiply connected space like a 3 torus has everywhere zero curvature but is finite in extent, whereas a flat simply connected space is infinite in extent (such as Euclidean space).

Observational evidence (WMAP, BOOMERanG, and Planck, for example) indicates that the observable universe is spatially flat to within a 0.4% margin of error of the spatial curvature parameter with an unknown global topology. It is unknown whether the universe is simply connected like Euclidean space or multiply connected like a torus.

== Shape of the observable universe ==
The universe's shape or the cosmic topology can be examined from two angles:

1. Local geometry: This relates to the curvature of the universe, primarily concerning what we can observe.
2. Global topology: This pertains to the universe's overall shape and structure.

General relativity, the theory behind modern cosmology, is based on differential geometry and it can only model local geometry. There are an infinite number of global shapes that match Einstein's equations. The global structure of the universe includes:

- whether the universe is infinite or finite in extent,
- whether the geometry of the global universe is flat, positively curved, or negatively curved, and,
- whether the topology is simply connected (for example, like a sphere) or else multiply connected (for example, like a torus).

The observable universe (of a given current observer) is a roughly spherical region extending about 46 billion light-years in every direction. It appears older and more redshifted the deeper we look into space. In theory, we could look all the way back to the Big Bang, but in practice, we can only see up to the cosmic microwave background (CMB) (roughly 370000 years after the Big Bang) as anything beyond that is opaque. Studies show that the observable universe is isotropic and homogeneous on the largest scales.

If the observable universe encompasses the entire universe, we might determine its structure through observation. However, if the observable universe is smaller, we can only grasp a portion of it, making it impossible to deduce the global geometry through observation. Different mathematical models of the universe's global geometry can be constructed, all consistent with observations and general relativity. Hence, it is unclear whether the observable universe matches the entire universe or is significantly smaller, though it is generally accepted that the universe is larger than the observable universe.

The universe may be compact in some dimensions and not in others. Such models can be tested by searching for topological lensing, such as multiple images of the same distant source or matched patterns in the cosmic microwave background. A small closed universe would produce multiple images of the same object in the sky, though not necessarily of the same age.

== Curved space ==
The curvature is a quantity describing how the geometry of a space differs locally from flat space. The curvature of any locally isotropic space (and hence of a locally isotropic universe) falls into one of the three following cases:

1. Zero curvature (flat) – a drawn triangle's angles add up to 180° and the Pythagorean theorem holds; such 3-dimensional space is locally modeled by Euclidean space E^{3}.
2. Positive curvature – a drawn triangle's angles add up to more than 180°; such 3-dimensional space is locally modeled by a region of a 3-sphere S^{3}.
3. Negative curvature – a drawn triangle's angles add up to less than 180°; such 3-dimensional space is locally modeled by a region of a hyperbolic space H^{3}.

Curved geometries are in the domain of non-Euclidean geometry. An example of a positively curved space would be the surface of a sphere such as the Earth. A triangle drawn from the equator to a pole will have at least two angles equal 90°, which makes the sum of the 3 angles greater than 180°. An example of a negatively curved surface would be the shape of a saddle or mountain pass. A triangle drawn on a saddle surface will have the sum of the angles adding up to less than 180°.

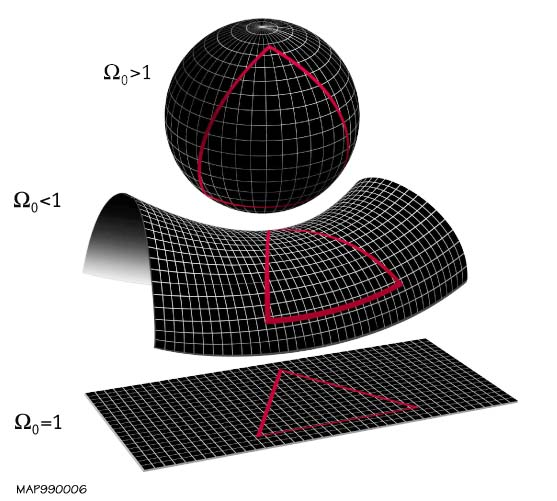
The local geometry of the universe is determined by whether the density parameter Ω is greater than, less than, or equal to 1. From top to bottom: a spherical universe with Ω > 1, a hyperbolic universe with Ω < 1, and a flat universe with Ω = 1. These depictions of two-dimensional surfaces are merely easily visualizable analogs to the 3-dimensional structure of (local) space.

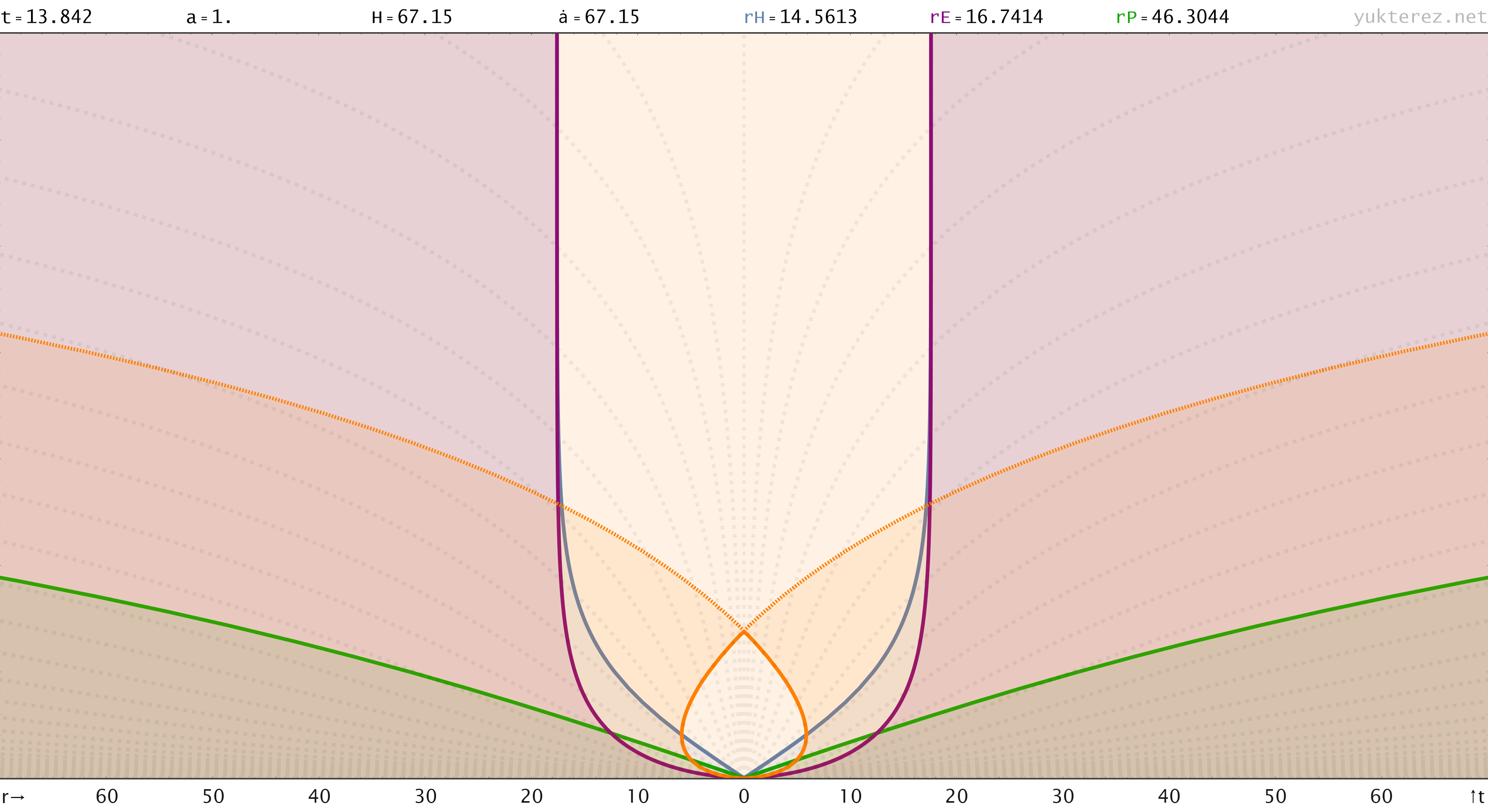
Proper distance spacetime diagram of our flat ΛCDM universe. Particle horizon: green, Hubble radius: blue, Event horizon: purple, Light cone: orange.

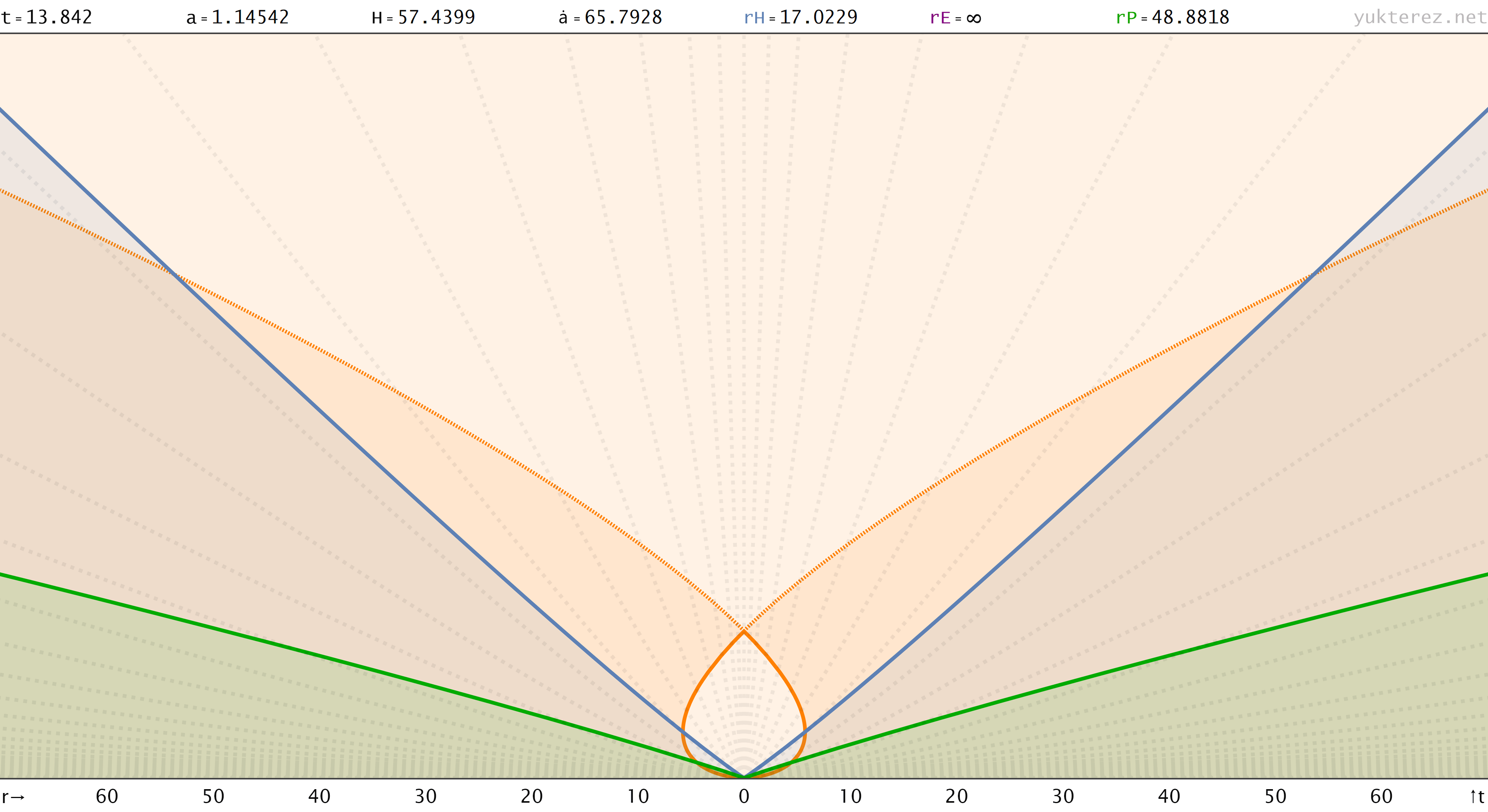
Hyperbolic universe with the same radiation and matter density parameters as ours, but with negative curvature instead of dark energy (Ω_{Λ}→Ω_{k}).

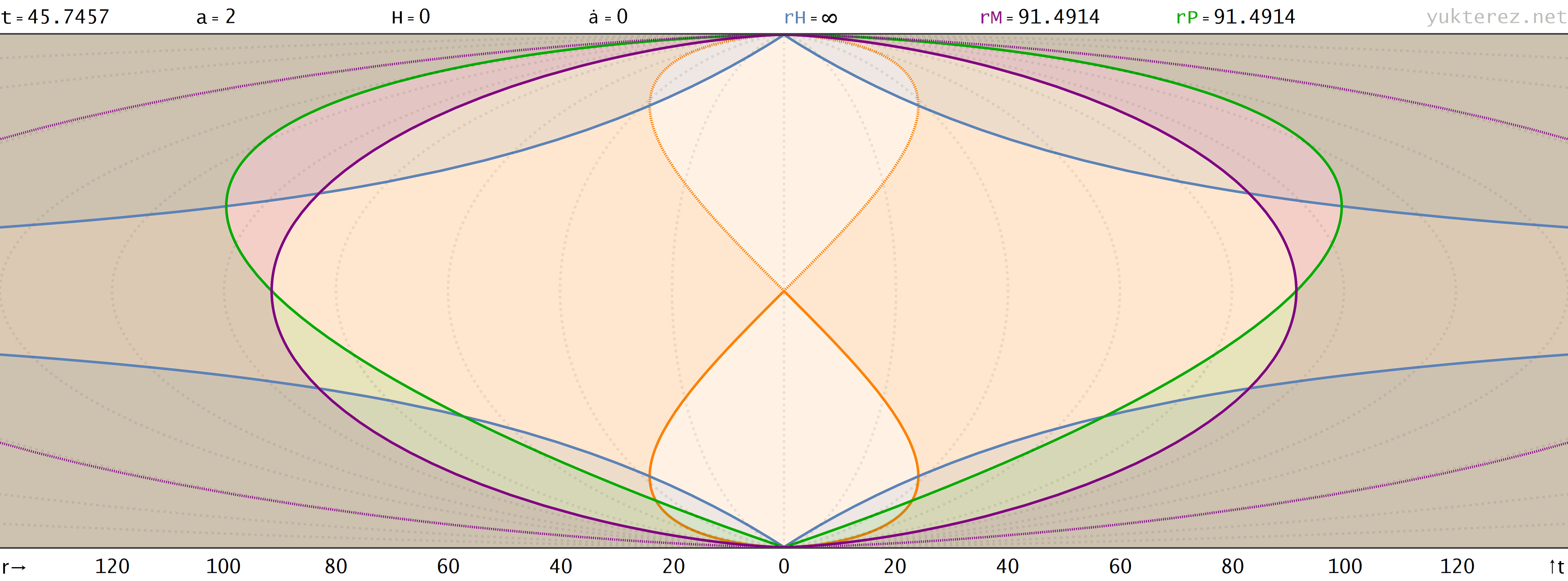
Closed universe without dark energy and with overcritical matter density, which leads to a Big Crunch. Neither the hyperbolic nor the closed examples have an Event horizon (here the purple curve is the cosmic Antipode).

General relativity explains that mass and energy determine the curvature of the universe. The relationship is quantified with the density parameter, represented with Omega (Ω). The density parameter is the average density of the universe divided by the critical energy density, that is, the mass energy needed for a universe to be flat:

- If Ω = 1, the universe is flat.
- If Ω > 1, there is positive curvature.
- If Ω < 1, there is negative curvature.

Scientists can calculate Ω to determine the curvature in two ways. One is to count all the mass–energy in the universe and take its average density, then divide that average by the critical energy density. Data from the Wilkinson Microwave Anisotropy Probe (WMAP) as well as the Planck spacecraft give values for the three constituents of all the mass–energy in the universe – normal mass (baryonic matter and dark matter), relativistic particles (predominantly photons and neutrinos), and dark energy or the cosmological constant:

Ω_{mass} ≈ 0.315±0.018
Ω_{relativistic} ≈ 9.24×10^{−5}
Ω_{Λ} ≈ 0.6817±0.0018
Ω_{total} = Ω_{mass} + Ω_{relativistic} + Ω_{Λ} = 1.00±0.02

The actual value for critical density value is measured as ρ_{critical} = 9.47×10^{−27} kg⋅m^{−3}. From these values, within experimental error, the universe seems to be spatially flat. Final results of the Planck mission, released in 2018, show the cosmological curvature parameter, 1 − Ω = Ω_{K} = −Kc^{2}/a^{2}H^{2}, to be 0.0007±0.0019, consistent with a flat universe.

Another way to measure Ω is to do so geometrically by measuring an angle across the observable universe. This can be done by using the CMB and measuring the power spectrum and temperature anisotropy. For instance, one can imagine finding a gas cloud that is not in thermal equilibrium due to being so large that light speed cannot propagate the thermal information. Knowing this propagation speed, we then know the size of the gas cloud as well as the distance to the gas cloud, we then have two sides of a triangle and can then determine the angles. Using a method similar to this, the BOOMERanG experiment has determined that the sum of the angles to 180° within experimental error, corresponding to Ω_{total} ≈ 1.00±0.12.

These and other astronomical measurements constrain the spatial curvature to be very close to zero, although they do not constrain its sign. This means that although the local geometries of spacetime are generated by the theory of relativity based on spacetime intervals, we can approximate 3-space by the familiar Euclidean geometry.

The Friedmann–Lemaître–Robertson–Walker (FLRW) model using Friedmann equations is commonly used to model the universe. The FLRW model provides a curvature of the universe based on the mathematics of fluid dynamics, that is, modeling the matter within the universe as a perfect fluid. Although stars and structures of mass can be introduced into an "almost FLRW" model, a strictly FLRW model is used to approximate the local geometry of the observable universe. Another way of saying this is that, if all forms of dark energy are ignored, then the curvature of the universe can be determined by measuring the average density of matter within it, assuming that all matter is evenly distributed (rather than the distortions caused by "dense" objects such as galaxies). This assumption is justified by the observations that, while the universe is "weakly" inhomogeneous and anisotropic (see the large-scale structure of the cosmos), it is on average homogeneous and isotropic when analyzed at a sufficiently large spatial scale.

== Size ==
The size of the universe is not known. The observable universe is a spherical region of the universe consisting of all matter that can be observed from Earth; the electromagnetic radiation from these astronomical objects has had time to reach the Solar System and Earth since the beginning of the cosmological expansion. The radius of this region is about 14.26 gigaparsecs (46.5 billion light-years or 4.40×10^{26} m).

One of the unanswered questions about the universe is whether it is infinite or finite in extent. For intuition, it can be understood that a finite universe has a finite volume that, for example, could be in theory filled with a finite amount of material, while an infinite universe is unbounded and no numerical volume could possibly fill it. Mathematically, the question of whether the universe is infinite or finite is referred to as boundedness. An infinite universe (unbounded metric space) means that there are points arbitrarily far apart: for any distance d, there are points that are of a distance at least d apart. A finite universe is a bounded metric space, where there is some distance d such that all points are within distance d of each other. The smallest such d is called the diameter of the universe, in which case the universe has a well-defined "volume" or "scale".

Estimates based on Bayesian model averaging suggest that the volume of the whole universe must be more than 250 times larger than a Hubble sphere.

It is plausible that the galaxies within the observable universe represent only a minuscule fraction of the galaxies in the universe. According to the theory of cosmic inflation initially introduced by Alan Guth and D. Kazanas, if it is assumed that inflation began about 10^{−37} seconds after the Big Bang and that the pre-inflation size of the universe was approximately equal to the speed of light times its age, that would suggest that at present the entire universe's size is at least 1.5×10^{34} light-years — this is at least 3×10^{23} times the radius of the observable universe.

Some disputed estimates for the total size of the universe, if finite, reach as high as $10^{10^{10^{122}}}$ megaparsecs, as implied by a suggested resolution of the No-Boundary Proposal. (Note: Although listed in megaparsecs by the cited source, this number is so vast that its digits would remain virtually unchanged for all intents and purposes regardless of which conventional units it is listed in, whether it to be nanometers or gigaparsecs, as the differences would disappear into the error.)

=== Boundary ===
Whether space is finite in extent is distinct from whether it has a boundary. In cosmological models, space is usually represented by a three-dimensional manifold. Such a manifold may be compact without having a boundary; a compact manifold without boundary is called a closed manifold. Familiar examples are the 3-sphere and the 3-torus. Both are compact and have no boundary, although the 3-sphere is simply connected and has positive curvature, whereas the 3-torus is multiply connected and flat. Thus a spatially finite universe need not have an edge, and the absence of an edge does not imply that the universe is spatially infinite.

If the universe has a compact topology on a scale comparable to or smaller than the observable universe, light may reach an observer along more than one topologically distinct path. This can in principle produce multiple images of the same astronomical objects or repeated patterns in the cosmic microwave background. One proposed test is the circles in the sky method, which searches for matching circles in the last-scattering surface produced by different lines of sight to the same physical region. Searches using Planck data found no evidence for the compact topologies tested at scales smaller than the diameter of the last-scattering surface, although substantial classes of possible topologies remain observationally unconstrained.

== Curvature ==
The curvature of the universe places constraints on the topology. If the spatial geometry is spherical, i.e., possess positive curvature, the topology is compact. For a flat (zero curvature) or a hyperbolic (negative curvature) spatial geometry, the topology can be either compact or infinite. Many textbooks erroneously state that a flat or hyperbolic universe implies an infinite universe; however, the correct statement is that a flat universe that is also simply connected implies an infinite universe. For example, Euclidean space is flat, simply connected, and infinite, but there are tori that are flat, multiply connected, finite, and compact (see flat torus).

In general, local to global theorems in Riemannian geometry relate the local geometry to the global geometry. If the local geometry has constant curvature, the global geometry is very constrained, as described in Thurston geometries.

The latest research shows that even the most powerful future experiments (like the SKA) will not be able to distinguish between a flat, open and closed universe if the true value of cosmological curvature parameter is smaller than 10^{−4}. If the true value of the cosmological curvature parameter is larger than 10^{−3} we will be able to distinguish between these three models even now.

=== Universe with zero curvature ===
In a universe with zero curvature, the local geometry is flat. The most familiar such global structure is that of Euclidean space, which is infinite in extent. Unusual topology like the 3-torus universe allow flat universes that are finite.

In the absence of dark energy, a flat universe expands forever but at a continually decelerating rate, with expansion asymptotically approaching zero. With dark energy, the expansion rate of the universe initially slows down, due to the effect of gravity, but eventually increases. The ultimate fate of the universe is the same as that of an open universe in the sense that space will continue expanding forever.

A flat universe can have zero total energy.

=== Universe with positive curvature ===
A positively curved universe is described by elliptic geometry, and can be thought of as a three-dimensional hypersphere, or some other spherical 3-manifold (such as the Poincaré dodecahedral space), all of which are quotients of the 3-sphere.

Poincaré dodecahedral space is a positively curved space, colloquially described as "soccerball-shaped", as it is the quotient of the 3-sphere by the binary icosahedral group, which is very close to icosahedral symmetry, the symmetry of a soccer ball. This was proposed by Jean-Pierre Luminet and colleagues in 2003 and an optimal orientation on the sky for the model was estimated in 2008.

=== Universe with negative curvature ===
A hyperbolic universe, one of a negative spatial curvature, is described by hyperbolic geometry, and can be thought of locally as a three-dimensional analog of an infinitely extended saddle shape. There is a great variety of hyperbolic 3-manifolds, and their classification is not completely understood. Those of finite volume can be understood via the Mostow rigidity theorem. For hyperbolic local geometry, many of the possible three-dimensional spaces are informally called "horn topologies", so called because of the shape of the pseudosphere, a canonical model of hyperbolic geometry. An example is the Picard horn, a negatively curved space, colloquially described as "funnel-shaped".

=== Curvature: open or closed ===
When cosmologists speak of the universe as being "open" or "closed", they most commonly are referring to whether the curvature is negative or positive, respectively. These meanings of open and closed are different from the mathematical meaning of open and closed used for sets in topological spaces and for the mathematical meaning of open and closed manifolds, which gives rise to ambiguity and confusion. In mathematics, there are definitions for a closed manifold (i.e., compact without boundary) and open manifold (i.e., one that is not compact and without boundary). A "closed universe" is necessarily a closed manifold. An "open universe" can be either a closed or open manifold. For example, in the Friedmann–Lemaître–Robertson–Walker (FLRW) model, the universe is considered to be without boundaries, in which case "compact universe" could describe a universe that is a closed manifold.

== History ==
Ancient mythologies variously described the universe as finite.

By way of the account of Diogenes Laërtius, for Leucippus (c. 5th century BC) the universe is spatially infinite. Eudoxus (c. 380 BC) in consideration of motion concluded that the stars were encompassed within a sphere. (Note: ἐν τρισὶν ἐτίθετ᾽ εἶναι σφαίραις, ὧν τὴν μὲν πρώτην τὴν τῶν ἀπλανῶν ἄστρων εἶναι) In the concept of Aristotle (384–322 BC), there existed concentric spheres located outwardly from Earth, the furthest of which contained the stars and was sometimes known as the kosmos. Outside the boundary of the furthest sphere there was no place of physically existing anything and no time, in addition to this outside the last sphere's edge there was no void.

From the conceptual foundation of Aristotle (Note: Aristotle knew of the thoughts of Leucippus (and Democritus) and considered the possibility of an infinite universe.) which became the model for Ptolemy (2nd century AD) postdate the time of the completion of his work, entitled in ancient Greek; Ὑποθέσεις τῶν πλανωμένων, the preferred general cosmology into the Middle Ages was that the cosmos was finite, which was known subsequently as Aristotelian cosmology. In Paradiso, Dante Alighieri (1308–1320) made a universe according to the Ptolemaic mode, in which the Earth was placed at the centre of a number of spheres, the outer of which was were humanity could find the location of the realm of God, an idea of reality that was the shared perception of all of the prominent thinkers of the medieval era. Thomas Bradwardine (1344) and Nicole Oresme during the 14th century contested the Aristotelian view on the basis of infinite God.

With the advent of the heliocentric model scientific thought realized the possibility of an infinite universe. By the use of the novel model of Nicolaus Copernicus, Thomas Digges in: A perfit description of the caelestiall orbs, published 1576, made explanation of such a model universe, at that time presenting an idealogical break in concept from the then tradition of the reality of a celestial outer realm known as Paradise.

Albert Einstein in consideration of his 1916 theory of general relativity demonstrated in 1917 a finite universe. The de Sitter infinite universe of 1917 was caused by the incompatibility of relativity with Euclidean space. David Hilbert (1925) thought the universe was determined finite by elliptical geometry or infinite by Euclidean geometry (i.e. flat).

In the 1990s and early 2000s, empirical methods for determining the global topology using measurements on scales that would show multiple imaging were proposed and applied to cosmological observations.

In the 2000s and 2010s, it was shown that, since the universe is inhomogeneous as shown in the cosmic web of large-scale structure, acceleration effects measured on local scales in the patterns of the movements of galaxies should, in principle, reveal the global topology of the universe.

== See also ==
- de Sitter space – Maximally symmetric Lorentzian manifold with a positive cosmological constant
- Ekpyrotic universe – Cosmological model—A string-theory-related model depicting a five-dimensional, membrane-shaped universe; an alternative to the Hot Big Bang Model, whereby the universe is described to have originated when two membranes collided at the fifth dimension
- Extra dimensions in string theory – Theory of subatomic structure for 6 or 7 extra space-like dimensions all with a compact topology
- History of the center of the Universe – Historical concept in cosmology
- Holographic principle – Principle in theoretical physics
- List of cosmology paradoxes – List of statements that appear to contradict themselves
- Spacetime topology – Topological structure of 4D spacetime
- Theorema Egregium – Result of differential geometry proved by Gauss—The "remarkable theorem" discovered by Gauss, which showed there is an intrinsic notion of curvature for surfaces. This is used by Riemann to generalize the (intrinsic) notion of curvature to higher-dimensional spaces
- Three-torus model of the universe – Cartesian product of 3 circles
- Zero-energy universe – Hypothesis that the total amount of energy in the universe is exactly zero
