= Friedmann–Lemaître–Robertson–Walker metric =

Metric based on the exact solution of Einstein's field equations of general relativity

The Friedmann–Lemaître–Robertson–Walker metric (FLRW; /ˈfriːdmən ləˈmɛtrə ... /) is a metric that describes a homogeneous, isotropic, expanding (or otherwise, contracting, oscillating or constant) universe that is path-connected, but not necessarily simply connected. The general form of the metric follows from the geometric properties of homogeneity and isotropy. Depending on geographical or historical preferences, the set of the four scientists – Alexander Friedmann, Georges Lemaître, Howard P. Robertson, and Arthur Geoffrey Walker – is variously grouped as Friedmann, Friedmann–Robertson–Walker (FRW), Robertson–Walker (RW), or Friedmann–Lemaître (FL). When combined with Einstein's field equations, the metric gives the Friedmann equations, which have been developed into the Standard Model of modern cosmology and further developed into the Lambda-CDM model.

== Concept ==
The metric is a consequence of assuming that the mass in the universe has constant density – homogeneity – and is the same in all directions – isotropy, the two conditions are known as the cosmological principle. Without the principle, a metric would need to be extracted from astronomical data, which may not be possible. Assuming isotropy alone is sufficient to reduce the possible motions of mass in the universe to radial velocity variations. Direct observation of stars has shown their velocities to be dominated by radial recession, validating these assumptions for cosmological models.

To measure distances in this space, that is to define a metric, we can compare the positions of two points in space, moving along with their local radial velocity of mass. Such points can be thought of as ideal galaxies. Each galaxy can be given a clock to track local time, with the clocks synchronized by imagining the radial velocities run backwards until the clocks coincide in space. The equivalence principle applied to each galaxy means distance measurements can be made using special relativity locally. So a distance $d\tau$ can be related to the local time t and the coordinates:

$$c^2d\tau^2 = c^2dt^2 - dx^2 - dy^2 -dz^2$$

An isotropic, homogeneous mass distribution is highly symmetric. Rewriting the metric in spherical coordinates reduces four coordinates to three coordinates. The radial coordinate is written as a product of a comoving coordinate, r, and a time-dependent scale factor R(t). The resulting metric can be written in several forms. Two common ones are:

$$c^2d\tau^2 = c^2dt^2 - R^2(t)\left(dr^2+ S^2_k(r) d\psi^2\right)$$

or

$$c^2 d\tau^2 = c^2 dt^2 - R^2(t)\left( \frac{dr^2}{1 - kr^2} + r^2 d\psi^2\right)$$

where $\psi$ is the angle between the two locations and

$$S_{-1}(r) = \sinh(r), S_0 = 1, S_1 = \sin(r).$$

(The meaning of r in these equations is not the same). Other common variations use a dimensionless scale factor

$$a(t) = \frac{R(t)}{R_0}$$

where time zero is now.

=== 2-dimensional analogy ===
The time-dependent scale factor $R(t)$, which plays a critical role in cosmology, has an analog in the radius of a sphere. A sphere is a 2-dimensional surface embedded in a 3-dimensional space. The radius of a sphere lives in the third dimension: it is not part of the 2-dimensional surface. However, the value of this radius affects distances measured on the two-dimensional surface. Similarly, the cosmological scale factor is not a distance in our 3-dimensional space, but its value affects the measurement of distances.

== FLRW models ==
Applying the metric to cosmology and predicting its time evolution requires Einstein's field equations and a way of calculating the density, $\rho (t),$ such as a cosmological equation of state. This process allows an approximate analytic solution of Einstein's field equations $G_{\mu\nu} + \Lambda g_{\mu\nu} = \kappa T_{\mu\nu}$ giving the Friedmann equations when the energy–momentum tensor is similarly assumed to be isotropic and homogeneous. Models based on the FLRW metric and obeying the Friedmann equations are called FRW models. Direct observation of stars has shown their velocities to be dominated by radial recession, validating these assumptions for cosmological models. These models are the basis of the standard Big Bang cosmological model, including the current ΛCDM model.

== General metric ==
The FLRW metric assumes homogeneity and isotropy of space. While these spatial symmetries allow the spatial geometry of the metric to be generally time-dependent, they restrict the temporal component ($g_{00}$) to be independent of spatial position. Consequently, through an appropriate choice of coordinate time—representing the proper time or "cosmic time" ticked by synchronized comoving observers—the temporal metric component can always be set to a constant. The generic metric that meets these conditions is

$$-c^2\mathrm{d}\tau^2 = -c^2\mathrm{d}t^2 + {a(t)}^2 \mathrm{d}\mathbf{\Sigma}^2,$$

where $\mathbf{\Sigma}$ ranges over a 3-dimensional space of uniform curvature, that is, elliptical space, Euclidean space, or hyperbolic space. It is normally written as a function of three spatial coordinates, but there are several conventions for doing so, detailed below. $\mathrm{d}\mathbf{\Sigma}$ does not depend on $t$ – all of the time dependence is in the function $a(t)$, known as the "scale factor".

=== Reduced-circumference polar coordinates ===
In reduced-circumference polar coordinates, the spatial metric has the form

$$\mathrm{d}\mathbf{\Sigma}^2 = \frac{\mathrm{d}r^2}{1-k r^2} + r^2 \mathrm{d}\mathbf{\Omega}^2, \quad \text{ where } \mathrm{d}\mathbf{\Omega}^2 = \mathrm{d}\theta^2 + \sin^2 \theta \, \mathrm{d}\phi^2.$$

$k$ is a constant representing the curvature of the space. There are two common unit conventions:

- $k$ may be taken to have units of length^{−2}, in which case $r$ has units of length and $a(t)$ is unitless. $k$ is then the Gaussian curvature of the space at the time when $a(t) = 1$. $r$ is sometimes called the reduced circumference because it is equal to the measured circumference of a circle (at that value of $r$), centered at the origin, divided by $2\pi$ (like the $r$ of Schwarzschild coordinates). Where appropriate, $a(t)$ is often chosen to equal 1 in the present cosmological era, so that $\mathrm{d}\mathbf{\Sigma}$ measures comoving distance.
- Alternatively, $k$ may be taken to belong to the set {−1, 0, +1} (for negative, zero, and positive curvature, respectively). Then $r$ is unitless and $a(t)$ has units of length. When $k = \pm1$, $a(t)$ is the radius of curvature of the space and may also be written $R(t)$.

A disadvantage of reduced circumference coordinates is that they cover only half of the 3-sphere in the case of positive curvature—circumferences beyond that point begin to decrease, leading to degeneracy. (This is not a problem if space is elliptical, i.e., a 3-sphere with opposite points identified.)

=== Hyperspherical coordinates ===
In hyperspherical or curvature-normalized coordinates, the coordinate $r$ is proportional to radial distance; this gives

$$\mathrm{d}\mathbf{\Sigma}^2 = \mathrm{d}r^2 + S_k(r)^2 \, \mathrm{d}\mathbf{\Omega}^2$$

where $\mathrm{d}\mathbf{\Omega}$ is as before and

$$S_k(r) = \begin{cases}
\sqrt{k}^{\,-1} \sin (r \sqrt{k}), &k > 0 \\
r, &k = 0 \\
\sqrt{|k|}^{\,-1} \sinh (r \sqrt{|k|}), &k < 0.
\end{cases}$$

As before, there are two common unit conventions:

- $k$ may be taken to have units of length^{−2}, in which case $r$ has units of length and $a(t)$ is unitless. $k$ is then the Gaussian curvature of the space at the time when $a(t) = 1$. Where appropriate, $a(t)$ is often chosen to equal 1 in the present cosmological era, so that $\mathrm{d}\mathbf{\Sigma}$ measures comoving distance.
- Alternatively, as before, $k$ may be taken to belong to the set {−1 ,0, +1} (for negative, zero, and positive curvature respectively). Then $r$ is unitless and $a(t)$ has units of length. When $k = \pm1$, $a(t)$ is the radius of curvature of the space and may also be written $R(t)$. Note that when $k = +1$, $r$ is essentially a third angle along with $\theta$ and $\phi$. The letter $\chi$ may be used instead of $r$.

Though it is usually defined piecewise as above, $S$ is an analytic function of both $k$ and $r$. It can also be written as a power series

$$S_k(r)
= \sum_{n=0}^\infty \frac{{\left(-1\right)}^n k^n r^{2n+1}}{(2n+1)!}
= r - \frac{k r^3}{6} + \frac{k^2 r^5}{120} - \cdots$$

or as

$$S_k(r) = r \; \mathrm{sinc} \, (r \sqrt{k}),$$

where $\mathrm{sinc}$ is the unnormalized sinc function and $\sqrt{k}$ is one of the imaginary, zero, or real square roots of $k$. These definitions are valid for all $k$.

=== Cartesian coordinates ===
When $k = 0$ one may write simply

$$\mathrm{d}\mathbf{\Sigma}^2 = \mathrm{d}x^2 + \mathrm{d}y^2 + \mathrm{d}z^2.$$

This can be extended to $k \ne 0$ by defining

$$\begin{align}
x &= r \cos \theta \,, \\
y &= r \sin \theta \cos \phi \,, \\
z &= r \sin \theta \sin \phi \,,
\end{align}$$

where $r$ is one of the radial coordinates defined above, but this is rare.

== Curvature ==
=== Cartesian coordinates ===
In flat $(k=0)$ FLRW space using Cartesian coordinates, the surviving components of the Ricci tensor are

$$R_{tt} = - 3 \frac{\ddot{a}}{a}, \quad R_{xx}= R_{yy} = R_{zz} = c^{-2} \left(a \ddot{a} + 2 \dot{a}^2\right)$$

and the Ricci scalar is

$$R = 6 c^{-2} \left(\frac{\ddot{a}(t)}{a(t)}  +  \frac{\dot{a}^2(t)}{a^2(t)}\right).$$

=== Spherical coordinates ===
In more general FLRW space using spherical coordinates (called "reduced-circumference polar coordinates" above), the surviving components of the Ricci tensor are

$$\begin{align}
R_{tt} &= - 3 \frac{\ddot{a}}{a}, \\[1ex]
R_{rr} &= \frac{c^{-2} \left(a\ddot{a} + 2\dot{a}^2\right) + 2k}{1 - kr^2} \\[1ex]
R_{\theta\theta} &= r^2 \left[c^{-2} \left(a\ddot{a} + 2\dot{a}^2\right) + 2k\right] \\[1ex]
R_{\phi\phi} &= r^2\sin^2(\theta) \left[c^{-2} \left(a\ddot{a} + 2\dot{a}^2\right) + 2k\right]
\end{align}$$

and the Ricci scalar is

$$R = \frac{6}{c^2} \left(\frac{\ddot{a}(t)}{a(t)} + \frac{\dot{a}^2(t)}{a^2(t)} + \frac{c^2k}{a^2(t)}\right).$$

== Name and history ==
In 1922 and 1924, the Soviet mathematician Alexander Friedmann and in 1927, Georges Lemaître, a Belgian priest, astronomer, and periodic professor of physics at the Catholic University of Leuven, arrived independently at results that relied on the metric. Howard P. Robertson from the US and Arthur Geoffrey Walker from the UK explored the problem further during the 1930s. In 1935, Robertson and Walker rigorously proved that the FLRW metric is the only one on a spacetime that is spatially homogeneous and isotropic (as noted above, this is a geometric result and is not tied specifically to the equations of general relativity, which Friedmann and Lemaître always assumed).

This solution, often called the Robertson–Walker metric since they proved its generic properties, is different from the dynamical "Friedmann–Lemaître" models. These models are specific solutions for a(t) that assume that the only contributions to stress-energy are cold matter ("dust"), radiation, and a cosmological constant.

== Current status ==
Unsolved problem in physics
Is the universe homogeneous and isotropic at large enough scales, as claimed by the cosmological principle? Is the CMB dipole purely kinematic, or does it signal a possible breakdown of the FLRW metric? Is the Friedmann–Lemaître–Robertson–Walker metric valid in the late universe?
More unsolved problems in physics

The current standard model of cosmology, the Lambda-CDM model, uses the FLRW metric. By combining the observation data from some experiments, such as WMAP and Planck, with theoretical results of the Ehlers–Geren–Sachs theorem and its generalization, astrophysicists now agree that the early universe is almost homogeneous and isotropic (when averaged over a very large scale) and thus nearly a FLRW spacetime. That being said, attempts to confirm the purely kinematic interpretation of the Cosmic Microwave Background (CMB) dipole through studies of radio galaxies and quasars show disagreement in the magnitude. Taken at face value, these observations are at odds with the universe being described by the FLRW metric. Moreover, one can argue that there is a maximum value to the Hubble constant within an FLRW cosmology tolerated by current observations, $H_0$ = 71±1 km/s/Mpc, and depending on how local determinations converge, this may point to a breakdown of the FLRW metric in the late universe, necessitating an explanation beyond the FLRW metric.
