= Friedmann equations =

Equations in physical cosmology

The Friedmann equations, also known as the Friedmann–Lemaître (FL) equations, are a set of equations in physical cosmology that govern cosmic expansion in homogeneous and isotropic models of the universe within the context of general relativity. They were first derived by Alexander Friedmann in 1922 from Einstein's field equations of gravitation for the Friedmann–Lemaître–Robertson–Walker metric and a perfect fluid with a given mass density ρ and pressure p. The equations for negative spatial curvature were given by Friedmann in 1924. The physical models built on the Friedmann equations are called FRW or FLRW models and form the Standard Model of modern cosmology, although such a description is also associated with the further developed Lambda-CDM model. The FLRW model was developed independently by the named authors in the 1920s and 1930s.

== Assumptions ==
The Friedmann equations use three assumptions:

1. the Friedmann–Lemaître–Robertson–Walker metric,
2. Einstein's equations for general relativity, and
3. a perfect fluid source.

The metric in turn starts with the simplifying assumption that the universe is spatially homogeneous and isotropic, that is, the cosmological principle; empirically, this is justified on scales larger than the order of 100 Mpc.

The metric can be written as:
$$c^2d\tau^2 = c^2dt^2 - R^2(t) \left(dr^2 + S^2_k(r) d\psi^2\right)$$
where
$$S_{-1}(r) = \sinh(r), S_0 = 1, S_1 = \sin(r).$$
These three possibilities correspond to parameter k of (0) flat space, (+1) a sphere of constant positive curvature or (−1) a hyperbolic space with constant negative curvature. Here the radial position has been decomposed into a time-dependent scale factor, $R(t)$, and a comoving coordinate, $r$. Inserting this metric into Einstein's field equations relates the evolution of this scale factor to the stress–energy tensor. Using the tensor for a perfect fluid results in the equations described below.

== Equations ==
There are two independent Friedmann equations for modelling a homogeneous, isotropic universe. The first is:
$$H^2\equiv {\left(\frac{\dot{R}}{R}\right)}^2  = \frac{8 \pi G \rho}{3} - \frac{k}{R^2} + \frac{\Lambda}{3},$$
and second is:
$$\frac{\ddot{R}}{R} = \frac{\Lambda}{3} -\frac{4 \pi G}{3}\left(\rho+3p\right).$$
The term Friedmann equation sometimes is used only for the first equation. In these equations, H is the Hubble parameter, R(t) is the cosmological scale factor, $G$ is the Newtonian constant of gravitation, Λ is the cosmological constant with dimension length^{−2}, ρ is the energy density and p is the isotropic pressure. k is constant throughout a particular solution, but may vary from one solution to another. The units set the speed of light in vacuum to one.

In previous equations, R, ρ, and p are functions of time. If the cosmological constant, Λ, is ignored, the term $-k/R^2$ in the first Friedmann equation can be interpreted as a Newtonian total energy, so the evolution of the universe pits gravitational potential energy, $8\pi G\rho/3$ against kinetic energy, $\dot{R}/R$. The winner depends upon the k value in the total energy: if k is +1, gravity eventually causes the universe to contract. These conclusions will be altered if the Λ is not zero.

Using the first equation, the second equation can be re-expressed as:
$$\dot{\rho} = -3 H \left(\rho + \frac{p}{c^2}\right),$$
which eliminates Λ. Alternatively the conservation of mass–energy:
$$T^{\alpha\beta}{}_{;\beta}= 0$$
leads to the same result.

=== Spatial curvature ===
The first Friedmann equation contains the discrete parameter k, the value of which determines the shape of the universe:

- +1 is a 3-sphere, the universe is "closed": starting off on some paths through the universe return to the starting point - analogous to a sphere: finite but unbounded.
- 0 is flat Euclidean space and infinite.
- −1 is a 3-hyperboloid the universe is "open": infinite and no paths return.

In the Friedmann model the choice between these different shapes is determined by a comparison between the expansion rate and the density. The expansion rate sets a critical density
$$\rho_c = \frac{3H^2}{8\pi G},$$
where $H$ is the Hubble parameter and $G$ is the gravitational constant. A universe at the critical density is spatially flat ($k=0$), while higher density gives a closed universe and lower density gives an open one.

== Dimensionless scale factor ==
A dimensionless scale factor can be defined:
$$a(t) \equiv \frac{R(t)}{R_0}$$
using the present day value
$$R_0 = R(\text{now}).$$
The Friedmann equations can be written in terms of this dimensionless scale factor:
$$H^2(t) = \left( \frac{\dot{a}}{a}\right)^2 = \frac{8\pi G}{3}\left[ \rho(t) + \frac{\rho_c - \rho_0}{a^2(t)}\right]$$
where $\dot{a} = da/dt$, $\rho_c = 3H^2_0/8\pi G$, and $\rho_0 = \rho(t=\text{now})$.

== Critical density ==
That value of the mass-energy density, $\rho$ that gives $k=0$ when $\Lambda=0$ is called the critical density:
$$\rho_c \equiv \frac{3H^2}{8\pi G}.$$
If the universe has higher density, $\rho \ge \rho_c$, then it is called "spatially closed": in this simple approximation the universe would eventually contract. On the other hand, if has lower density, $\rho \le \rho_c$, then it is called "spatially open" and expands forever. Therefore the geometry of the universe is directly connected to its density.

== Density parameter ==
The density parameter Ω is defined as the ratio of the actual (or observed) density ρ to the critical density ρ_{c} of the Friedmann universe:
$$\Omega := \frac{\rho}{\rho_{c}} = \frac{8 \pi G\rho}{3 H^2}.$$
Both the density $\rho(t)$ and the Hubble parameter $H(t)$ depend upon time and thus the density parameter varies with time.

The critical density is equivalent to approximately five atoms (of monatomic hydrogen) per cubic metre, whereas the average density of ordinary matter in the Universe is believed to be 0.2–0.25 atoms per cubic metre.

Estimated relative distribution for components of the energy density of the universe. Dark energy dominates the total energy (74%) while dark matter (22%) constitutes most of the mass. Of the remaining baryonic matter (4%), only one tenth is compact. In February 2015, the European-led research team behind the Planck cosmology probe released new data refining these values to 4.9% ordinary matter, 25.9% dark matter and 69.1% dark energy.

A much greater density comes from the unidentified dark matter, although both ordinary and dark matter contribute in favour of contraction of the universe. However, the largest part comes from so-called dark energy, which accounts for the cosmological constant term. Although the total density is equal to the critical density (exactly, up to measurement error), dark energy does not lead to contraction of the universe but rather may accelerate its expansion.

An expression for the critical density is found by assuming Λ to be zero (as it is for all basic Friedmann universes) and setting the normalised spatial curvature, k, equal to zero. When the substitutions are applied to the first of the Friedmann equations given the new $H_0$ value we find:
$$\begin{align}
\rho = \frac{3 H_0^2}{8 \pi G}
&\approx 1.10 \times 10^{-26} \mathrm{kg \, m^{-3}}
\\&\approx 1.88 \times 10^{-26} h^2\, {\rm kg}\, {\rm m}^{-3}
\\&\approx 2.78 \times 10^{11} h^2 M_\odot\,{\rm Mpc}^{-3}
\end{align}$$
where:

- $H_0 = 76.5 \pm 2.2 \, \mathrm{km \, s^{-1} \, Mpc^{-1}} \approx 2.48 \times 10^{-18} \mathrm{s^{-1}}$
- $h = \frac{H_0}{100 \, \mathrm{(km/s)/Mpc}}$
- $\rho_c = 8.5 \times 10^{-27} \mathrm{kg / m^3}$

Given the value of dark energy to be $\Omega_\Lambda = 0.647$ This term originally was used as a means to determine the spatial geometry of the universe, where ρ_{c} is the critical density for which the spatial geometry is flat (or Euclidean). Assuming a zero vacuum energy density, if Ω is larger than unity, the space sections of the universe are closed; the universe will eventually stop expanding, then collapse. If Ω is less than unity, they are open; and the universe expands forever. However, one can also subsume the spatial curvature and vacuum energy terms into a more general expression for Ω in which case this density parameter equals exactly unity. Then it is a matter of measuring the different components, usually designated by subscripts. According to the ΛCDM model, there are important components of Ω due to baryons, cold dark matter and dark energy. The spatial geometry of the universe has been measured by the WMAP spacecraft to be nearly flat. This means that the universe can be well approximated by a model where the spatial curvature parameter k is zero; however, this does not necessarily imply that the universe is infinite: it might merely be that the universe is much larger than the part we see.

The first Friedmann equation is often seen in terms of the present values of the density parameters, that is
$$\frac{H^2}{H_0^2} = \Omega_{0,\mathrm R} a^{-4} + \Omega_{0,\mathrm M} a^{-3} + \Omega_{0,k} a^{-2} + \Omega_{0,\Lambda}.$$
Here Ω_{0,R} is the radiation density today (when a = 1), Ω_{0,M} is the matter (dark plus baryonic) density today, Ω_{0,k} = 1 − Ω_{0} is the "spatial curvature density" today, and Ω_{0,Λ} is the cosmological constant or vacuum density today.

== FLRW models ==
Relativisitic cosmology models based on the FLRW metric and obeying the Friedmann equations are called FRW models. Direct observation of stars has shown their velocities to be dominated by radial recession, validating these assumptions for cosmological models. These models are the basis of the standard model of Big Bang cosmological including the current ΛCDM model.

To apply the metric to cosmology and predict its time evolution via the scale factor $a(t)$ requires Einstein's field equations together with a way of calculating the density, $\rho (t),$ such as a cosmological equation of state. This process allows an approximate analytic solution Einstein's field equations $G_{\mu\nu} + \Lambda g_{\mu\nu} = \kappa T_{\mu\nu}$ giving the Friedmann equations when the energy–momentum tensor is similarly assumed to be isotropic and homogeneous. The resulting equations are:
$$\begin{align}
{\left(\frac{\dot a}{a}\right)}^2 + \frac{kc^2}{a^2} - \frac{\Lambda c^2}{3} &= \frac{\kappa c^4}{3}\rho \\[4pt]
2\frac{\ddot a}{a} + {\left(\frac{\dot a}{a}\right)}^2 + \frac{kc^2}{a^2} - \Lambda c^2 &= -\kappa c^2 p .
\end{align}$$

Because the FLRW model assumes homogeneity, some popular accounts mistakenly assert that the Big Bang model cannot account for the observed lumpiness of the universe. In a strictly FLRW model, there are no clusters of galaxies or stars, since these are objects much denser than a typical part of the universe. Nonetheless, the FLRW model is used as a first approximation for the evolution of the real, lumpy universe because it is simple to calculate, and models that calculate the lumpiness in the universe are added onto the FLRW models as extensions. Most cosmologists agree that the observable universe is well approximated by an almost FLRW model, i.e., a model that follows the FLRW metric apart from primordial density fluctuations. As of 2003, the theoretical implications of the various extensions to the FLRW model appear to be well understood, and the goal is to make these consistent with observations from COBE and WMAP.

=== Interpretation ===
The pair of equations given above is equivalent to the following pair of equations
$$\begin{align}
\dot{\rho} &= - 3 \frac{\dot a}{a} \left(\rho+\frac{p}{c^2}\right) \\[1ex]
\frac{\ddot{a}}{a} &= - \frac{\kappa c^4}{6} \left(\rho + \frac{3p}{c^2}\right) + \frac{\Lambda c^2}{3}
\end{align}$$
with $k$, the spatial curvature index, serving as a constant of integration for the first equation.

The first equation can be derived also from thermodynamical considerations and is equivalent to the first law of thermodynamics, assuming the expansion of the universe is an adiabatic process (which is implicitly assumed in the derivation of the Friedmann–Lemaître–Robertson–Walker metric).

The second equation states that both the energy density and the pressure cause the expansion rate of the universe ${\dot a}$ to decrease, i.e., both cause a deceleration in the expansion of the universe. This is a consequence of gravitation, with pressure playing a similar role to that of energy (or mass) density, according to the principles of general relativity. The cosmological constant, on the other hand, causes an acceleration in the expansion of the universe.

=== Cosmological constant ===
The cosmological constant term can be omitted if we make the following replacements
$$\begin{align}
\rho &\to \rho - \frac{\Lambda}{\kappa c^2}, &
p &\to p + \frac{\Lambda}{\kappa}.
\end{align}$$

Therefore, the cosmological constant can be interpreted as arising from a form of energy that has negative pressure, equal in magnitude to its (positive) mass-energy density:
$$p = - \rho c^2 \,,$$
which is an equation of state of vacuum with dark energy.

An attempt to generalize this to
$$p =  w \rho c^2$$
would not have general invariance without further modification.

In fact, in order to get a term that causes an acceleration of the universe expansion, it is enough to have a scalar field that satisfies
$$p < - \frac {\rho c^2} {3} .$$
Such a field is sometimes called quintessence.

=== Dust models ===
Setting the pressure of the perfect fluid in the Friedmann equations to zero ($p=0$) gives a cosmological dust model.

=== Newtonian analog ===
In 1934 McCrea and Milne showed that the Friedmann equations in the case of a pressureless fluid can be derived with non-relativistic Newtonian dynamics.
$$\begin{align}
- a^3 \dot{\rho} = 3 a^2 \dot{a} \rho + \frac{3 a^2 p \dot{a}}{c^2} \, \\[1ex]
\frac{\dot{a}^2}{2} - \frac{\kappa c^4 a^3 \rho}{6a} = - \frac{k c^2}{2} \,.
\end{align}$$

The first equation says that the decrease in the mass contained in a fixed cube (whose side is momentarily a) is the amount that leaves through the sides due to the expansion of the universe plus the mass equivalent of the work done by pressure against the material being expelled. This is the conservation of mass–energy (first law of thermodynamics) contained within a part of the universe.

The second equation says that the kinetic energy (seen from the origin) of a particle of unit mass moving with the expansion plus its (negative) gravitational potential energy (relative to the mass contained in the sphere of matter closer to the origin) is equal to a constant related to the curvature of the universe. In other words, the energy (relative to the origin) of a co-moving particle in free-fall is conserved. General relativity merely adds a connection between the spatial curvature of the universe and the energy of such a particle: positive total energy implies negative curvature and negative total energy implies positive curvature.

== Useful solutions ==
The Friedmann equations can be solved exactly in presence of a perfect fluid with equation of state
$$p = w \rho c^2,$$
where p is the pressure, ρ is the mass density of the fluid in the comoving frame and w is some constant.

In spatially flat case (k = 0), the solution for the scale factor is
$$a(t) = a_0 \, t^{\frac{2}{3(w+1)}}$$
where a_{0} is some integration constant to be fixed by the choice of initial conditions. This family of solutions labelled by w is extremely important for cosmology. For example, w = 0 describes a matter-dominated universe, where the pressure is negligible with respect to the mass density. From the generic solution one easily sees that in a matter-dominated universe the scale factor goes as
$$a(t) \propto t^{2/3} \qquad \text{matter-dominated}$$

Another important example is the case of a radiation-dominated universe, namely when w = 1/3. This leads to
$$a(t) \propto t^{1/2} \qquad \text{radiation-dominated}$$

Note that this solution is not valid for domination of the cosmological constant, which corresponds to an w = −1. In this case the energy density is constant and the scale factor grows exponentially.

Solutions for other values of k can be found at Tersic, Balsa. "Lecture Notes on Astrophysics".

=== Mixtures ===
If the matter is a mixture of two or more non-interacting fluids each with such an equation of state, then
$$\dot{\rho}_{f} = -3 H \left( \rho_{f} + \frac{p_{f}}{c^2} \right)$$
holds separately for each such fluid f. In each case,
$$\dot{\rho}_{f} = -3 H \left( \rho_{f} + w_{f} \rho_{f} \right) \,$$
from which we get
$${\rho}_{f} \propto a^{-3 \left(1 + w_{f}\right)} \,.$$

For example, one can form a linear combination of such terms
$$\rho = A a^{-3} + B a^{-4} + C a^0 \,$$
where A is the density of "dust" (ordinary matter, w = 0) when a = 1; B is the density of radiation (w = 1/3) when a = 1; and C is the density of "dark energy" (w = −1). One then substitutes this into
$$\left(\frac{\dot{a}}{a}\right)^2 = \frac{8 \pi G}{3} \rho - \frac{kc^2}{a^2}$$
and solves for a as a function of time.

== History ==
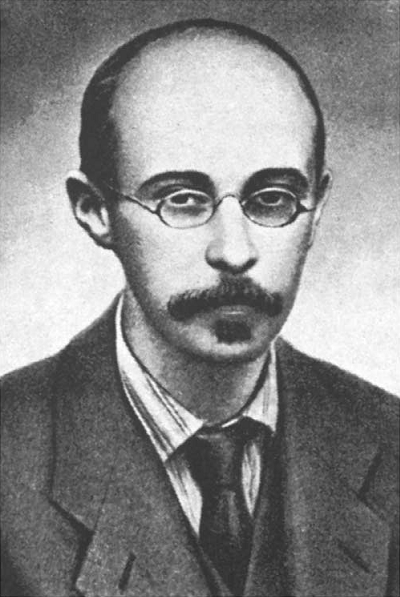
Alexander Friedmann

Friedmann published two cosmology papers in the 1922-1923 time frame. He adopted the same homogeneity and isotropy assumptions used by Albert Einstein and by Willem de Sitter in their papers, both published in 1917. Both of the earlier works also assumed the universe was static, eternally unchanging. Einstein postulated an additional term to his equations of general relativity to ensure this stability. In his paper, de Sitter showed that spacetime had curvature even in the absence of matter: the new equations of general relativity implied that a vacuum had properties that altered spacetime.

The universe being static was a fundamental assumption of philosophy and science. However, Friedmann abandoned the idea in his first paper "On the Curvature of Space". Starting with Einstein's 10 equations of relativity, Friedmann applies the symmetry of an isotropic universe and a simple model for mass-energy density to derive a relationship between that density and the curvature of spacetime. He demonstrates that in addition to a single static solution, many time dependent solutions also exist.

Friedmann's second paper, "On the Possibility of a World With Constant Negative Curvature," published in 1924 explored more complex geometrical ideas. This paper established the idea that the finiteness of spacetime was not a property that could be established based on the equations of general relativity alone: both finite and infinite geometries could be used to give solutions. Friedmann used two concepts of a three dimensional sphere as analogy: a trip at constant latitude could return to the starting point or the sphere might have an infinite number of sheets and the trip never repeats.

Friedmann's papers were largely ignored except – initially – by Einstein who actively dismissed them. However once Edwin Hubble published astronomical evidence that the universe was expanding, Einstein became convinced. Independently of Friedmann, Georges Lemaître discovered some aspects of the same solutions and wrote persuasively about the concept of a universe born from a "primordial atom". Lemaître was credited with the Big Bang concept, but Friedmann's ideas were deeper and ultimately more influential for scientists.

== In popular culture ==
Several students at Tsinghua University (CCP leader Xi Jinping's alma mater) participating in the 2022 COVID-19 protests in China carried placards with Friedmann equations scrawled on them, interpreted by some as a play on the words "Free man". Others have interpreted the use of the equations as a call to “open up” China and stop its Zero Covid policy, as the Friedmann equations relate to the expansion, or “opening” of the universe.

== See also ==
- Mathematics of general relativity
- Solutions of the Einstein field equations
