= Nicholas B. Suntzeff =

American astronomer and cosmologist

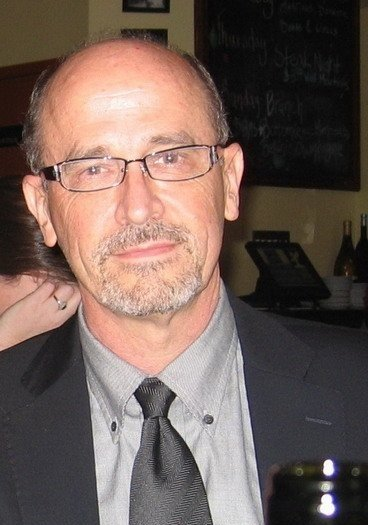
- Houston, Texas 2009
- Born: Nicholas Boris Suntzeff; November 22, 1952 (age 73); San Francisco, California, United States
- Education: Stanford University; University of California, Santa Cruz; Lick Observatory
- Known for: Observational cosmology based on supernovae
- Scientific career
- Fields: Astronomy; Cosmology
- Workplaces: Texas A&M University, United States Department of State
- Doctoral advisor: Robert Kraft

Nicholas Boris Suntzeff (born November 22, 1952, San Francisco) is an American astronomer and cosmologist. He is a university distinguished professor and holds the Mitchell/Heep/Munnerlyn Chair of Observational Astronomy in the Department of Physics & Astronomy at Texas A&M University where he is director of the Astronomy Program. He is an observational astronomer specializing in cosmology, supernovae, stellar populations, and astronomical instrumentation. With Brian Schmidt he founded the High-z Supernova Search Team, which was honored with the Nobel Prize in Physics in 2011 to Schmidt and Adam Riess.

== Education ==
Suntzeff graduated from Neil Cummins Elementary School in Corte Madera, California and Redwood High School in Larkspur, California. He received his B.S. with distinction in mathematics from Stanford University in 1974 and his Ph.D. in astronomy & astrophysics from the University of California, Santa Cruz and Lick Observatory in 1980. While undergraduates at Stanford University, Suntzeff and engineering student Michael Kast built the Stanford Student Observatory.

== Work ==
After graduating in 1980, he worked as a postdoctoral research associate with Professor George Wallerstein in the Department of Astronomy at University of Washington. From 1982 to 1986 he was a Carnegie/Las Campanas Fellow at the Mount Wilson & Las Campanas Observatories, now called the Observatories of the Carnegie Institution for Science.

After moving to Chile in 1986, Suntzeff working with Mark M. Phillips and Mario Hamuy at CTIO used the newly developed cryogenic CCD cameras to produce the first modern light curve of a Type Ia supernova. The fundamental calibration for distances to Type Ia supernovae was invented by the Calán/Tololo Supernova Survey, founded by Mario Hamuy, Jose Maza, Mark M. Phillips, and Suntzeff. The Survey, formed after discussions at the Santa Cruz meeting on supernovae and the encouragement by Allan R. Sandage to use Type Ia supernovae to measure the Hubble constant H_{0} and the deceleration parameter q_{0}, ran from 1990 to 1995, and provided the pioneering method to measure precision distances to external galaxies, leading to a precise value of the Hubble constant.

Continuing the work of the Calán/Tololo Survey, Suntzeff with Brian P. Schmidt co-founded the High-Z Supernova Search Team in 1994 that used observations of extragalactic supernovae to discover the accelerating universe. This universal acceleration implies the existence of dark energy consistent with the cosmological constant of Albert Einstein's theory of General Relativity, and was voted the top science breakthrough of 1998 by Science magazine.

Prior to 2006, he was the associate director of science at the US National Optical Astronomy Observatory, and astronomer at Cerro Tololo Inter-American Observatory. In 2007, he was elected councilor of the American Astronomical Society, and in 2010, he was elected vice president of the same society. He has been awarded a 2010 Jefferson Senior Science Fellowship of the National Academy of Sciences to work at the US Department of State where he is a Humanitarian Affairs Officer in the Bureau of Human Rights of the Office of International Organization Affairs. He is also an adjunct professor in the Department of Astronomy at the University of Texas at Austin. He became emeritus in February 2024.

The American Physics Society citation in 2017 recognized Suntzeff for "... essential contributions and leadership in observational cosmology and astrophysics; investigations into the phenomenology of Type Ia supernovae which laid the groundwork for the discovery of the accelerated expansion of the Universe; and for cofounding one of the two teams that made this discovery."

In announcing his award as a 2023 American Astronomical Society Fellow, he was cited "For his transformational leadership in the foundation of supernova cosmology, the discovery of the accelerated expansion of the universe, and precision measurements of the Hubble–Lemaître flow; for his service to the national and international astronomical communities; for considerable efforts on behalf of human rights, especially the LGBTQ community, both within astronomy and globally; and for establishing the astronomy program at Texas A&M University."

== Honors and awards ==
- Phi Beta Kappa, Beta Chapter, Stanford University, 1974
- President, Graduate Student Association, University of California, Santa Cruz, 1979–1980
- Robert J. Trumpler Award for the outstanding Ph.D. in astronomy in North America in 1983
- Carnegie Fellowship, Mount Wilson Observatory, 1983
- AURA Science Award, personally in 1992 and with the CTIO Supernova Team in 1998
- Breakthrough of the Year, Science, 1998
- Mitchell/Heep/Munnerlyn Endowed Chair in Observational Astronomy, Texas A&M University, 2006
- Gruber Cosmology Prize with the High-z Supernova Search Team in 2007
- Jefferson Senior Science Fellowship, National Academy of Sciences and US Department of State, 2010
- Distinguished Achievement Award of Texas A&M University 2012
- Distinguished University Professor, Texas A&M University system, 2013
- George H. W. Bush Achievement Award, 2013
- Breakthrough Prize in Fundamental Physics, 2015
- Fellow of the American Physical Society, 2017
- Regents Professor of the Texas A&M University System, 2017
- Fellow of the American Astronomical Society, 2023
- Fellow of the American Association for the Advancement of Science, 2023
- Distinguished Alumnus, University of California, Santa Cruz, 2026

== Ancestry and personal life ==
He is a native of San Francisco and grew up in Corte Madera, California. He is the paternal grandson of Matvei Andrianovich Evdokimov (1887–1920) (Russian: Матвей Андрианович Евдокимов), one of the principal private arms manufacturers in czarist Russia, located in Izhevsk. The Evdokimov factory in Izhevsk began in the 1860s by Andrian Nikandrovich Evdokimov (1844–1917 (Russian: Андриан Никандрович Евдокимов), and by 1890, was manufacturing Mosin–Nagant and Berdan rifles. They continued production until the Russian Civil War in 1917. These rifles were used during the Revolution and World War I, and were retooled for use during World War II, especially by the Finnish Army.

Although not supporters of the White cause, for their safety the family of Matvei fled east with Admiral Kolchak, the White Army, and the Czech Legion when the Whites captured Perm in 1918. Matvei died at Manchurian Station (Manzhouli) near Chita. His only child, Nicholai Matveevich Evdiokimov (1918–1995) (Russian: Николай Матвеевич Евдокимов) continued with Matvei's wife Zoya Vasilevna Suntzeva (Russian: Зоя Васильевна Сунцевa) (1897–1976), with the Suntzeff family to Harbin China and then to the San Francisco in 1928. Nicholai assumed the last name of his mother and immigrated into the US as Nicholas Matveevich Suntzeff (Russian: Николай Матвеевич Сунцев). The Suntzeff family, prominent merchants from the Ural region, came from Motovilikha (now part of Perm, Russia) and have ancestry in the Udmurt people. A bridge "Сунцев мост" in Motovilikha was named after the family store nearby.

Suntzeff is mentioned in the Alan Alda memoir, Never Have Your Dog Stuffed: and Other Things I've Learned.
