= Calán/Tololo Survey =

Supernova survey

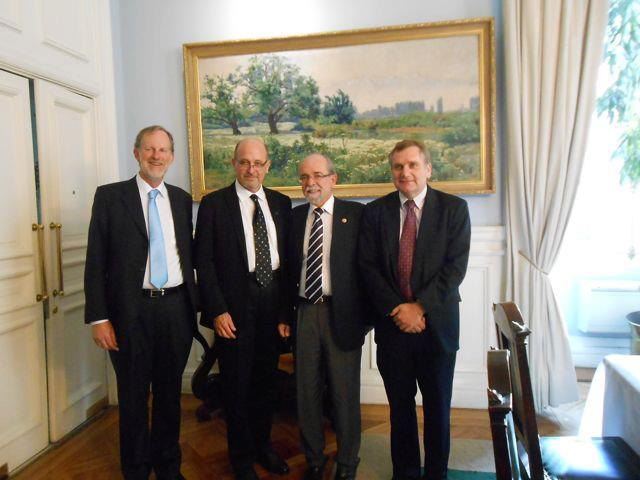
The original team members of the Calan/Tololo Survey. Left to right: Mark M. Phillips, Nicholas Suntzeff, José Maza Sancho, Mario Hamuy, 2012.

The Calán/Tololo Supernova Survey was a supernovae survey that ran from 1989 to 1995 at the University of Chile and the Cerro Tololo Inter-American Observatory to measure a Hubble diagram out to redshifts of 0.1. It was founded by Mario Hamuy, José Maza Sancho, Mark M. Phillips, and Nicholas B. Suntzeff in 1989 out of discussions at the UC Santa Cruz meeting on supernovae on how to improve the Hubble diagram using Type Ia supernovae. It was also motivated by the suggestion of Allan Sandage to restart a supernova survey after the Sandage and Tammann survey failed due to poor quality photographic plates in 1986. The Survey was built on the original supernova survey of Maza done at the f/3 Maksutov Camera at the Cerro Roble Observatory of the University of Chile between 1979 and 1984. The Survey used the CTIO Curtis Schmidt telescope with IIa-O photographic plates, each plate covering a field of 25 sq-deg on the sky. The plates were developed and sent by bus to Santiago, Chile, the next morning, and searched for supernovae at the Department of Astronomy at the University of Chile. Any supernova candidates were then observed the next night using the 0.9m telescope at CTIO with a CCD camera. This was one of the first studies done in astronomy where the telescope time was scheduled to observe objects not yet discovered.

The survey discovered 50 supernovae between 1990 and 1993, of which 32 were Type Ia supernovae. The survey provided a uniform photometric and spectroscopic dataset of all classes of supernovae, which led to the discovery of a method of using Type Ia supernovae as standard candles, the Phillips relationship, as well as providing data for a Hubble diagram of Type II supernovae using the expanding photosphere method. In 1994, the Calán/Tololo team formed a parallel project, the High-Z Supernova Search Team, organized by Nicholas Suntzeff and Brian Schmidt, which later discovered the accelerated expansion of the universe in 1998.

The calibration of Type Ia supernovae as standard candles led to the precise measurements of the Hubble Constant H_{0} and the deceleration parameter q_{0}, the latter indicating the presence of a dark energy or cosmological constant dominating the mass/energy of the Universe. The Calán/Tololo data of nearby Type Ia supernovae were used as the anchors for the Hubble flow measurements both by the High-Z Supernova Search Team and the Supernova Cosmology Project. Their pioneering work was cited in the award of the 2011 Nobel Prize in Physics
