= Bruno Leibundgut =

Swiss astronomer (born 1960)

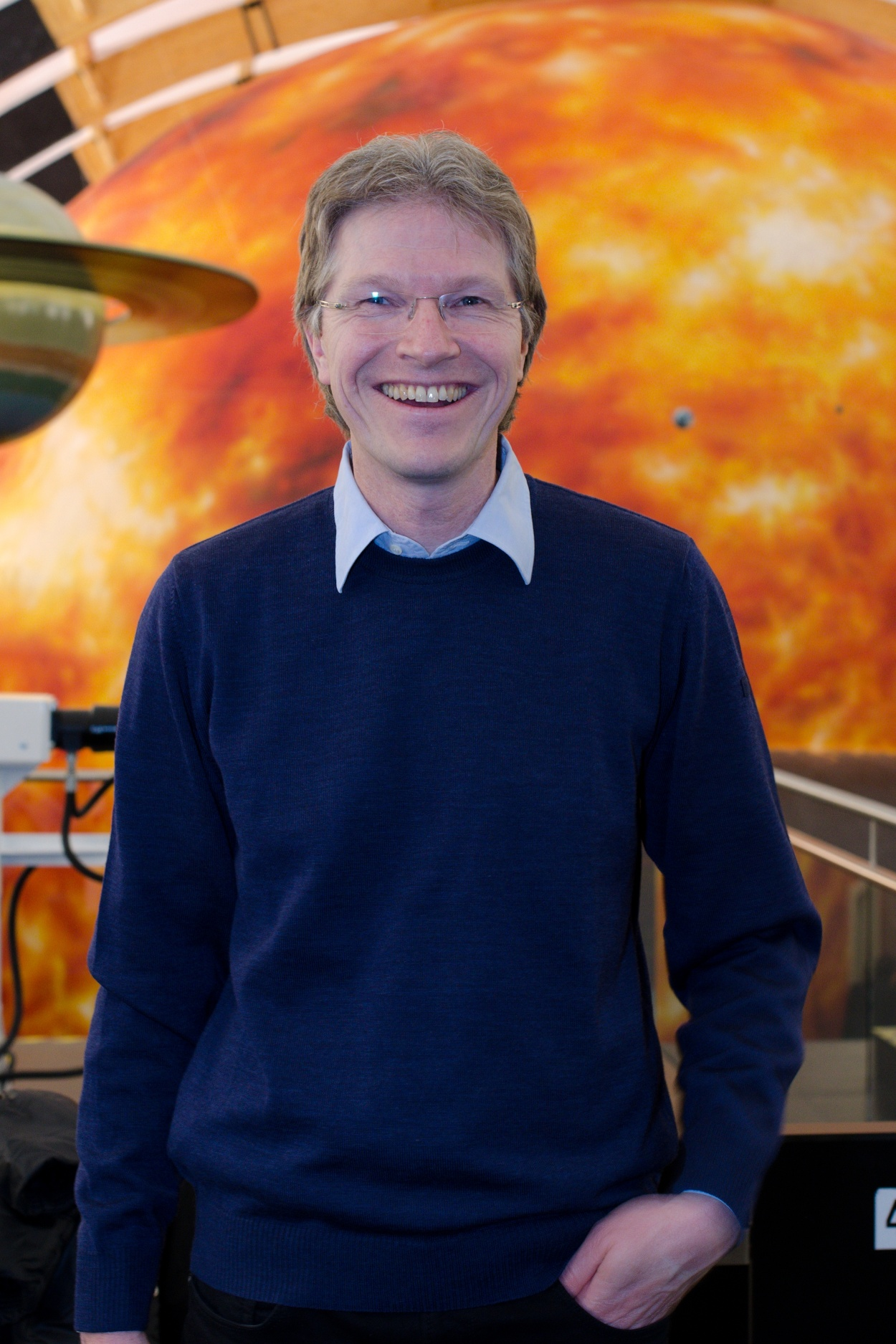
Bruno Leibundgut visiting Techmania Science Center, Czech Republic

Bruno Leibundgut (born 1 April 1960) is a Swiss astronomer born in Basel. His work focuses on supernovae and cosmology. He was a member of the High-z Supernova Search Team and participated in the planning, development and start of the operations of the Very Large Telescope.

== Career ==
Leibundgut received his doctorate at the University of Basel in 1988 under the supervision of Gustav Andreas Tammann. His thesis was titled "Light Curves of Supernovae Type I". He was a postdoctoral researcher at Harvard working with Robert Kirshner and at Berkeley with Alex Filippenko. He is the author or co-author of over 140 refereed papers with more than 35,000 citations.

Since 1993, he has worked as an astronomer at ESO. He has had various roles such as deputy programme scientist for the VLT, head of the user support group in Garching and Director for Science. He was on sabbatical in 2014. He was the Very Large Telescope programme scientist from 2015 to 2022 and has been re-appointed director for science at ESO in 2023.

He is an Honorary Professor at the Technical University of Munich since 2019

He is the co-principal investigator of the adH0cc programme which aims to determine the current expansion rate of the Universe, the so-called Hubble constant (see Hubble law) by measuring distances to Type II supernova in the Hubble flow using the Tailored Expanding Photosphere Method.

== Awards ==
- 2007: Gruber Prize in Cosmology (co-recipient with High-z Supernova Search Team)
- 2011: Nobel Prize in Physics was awarded to Leibundgut's colleagues Brian P. Schmidt and Adam Riess, from the High-z Supernova Search Team for the work done by that collaboration.
- 2015: Breakthrough Prize in Fundamental Physics, shared with Brian P. Schmidt, Adam Riess, and the High-Z Supernova Search Team.
