= Mario Hamuy =

Chilean astronomer

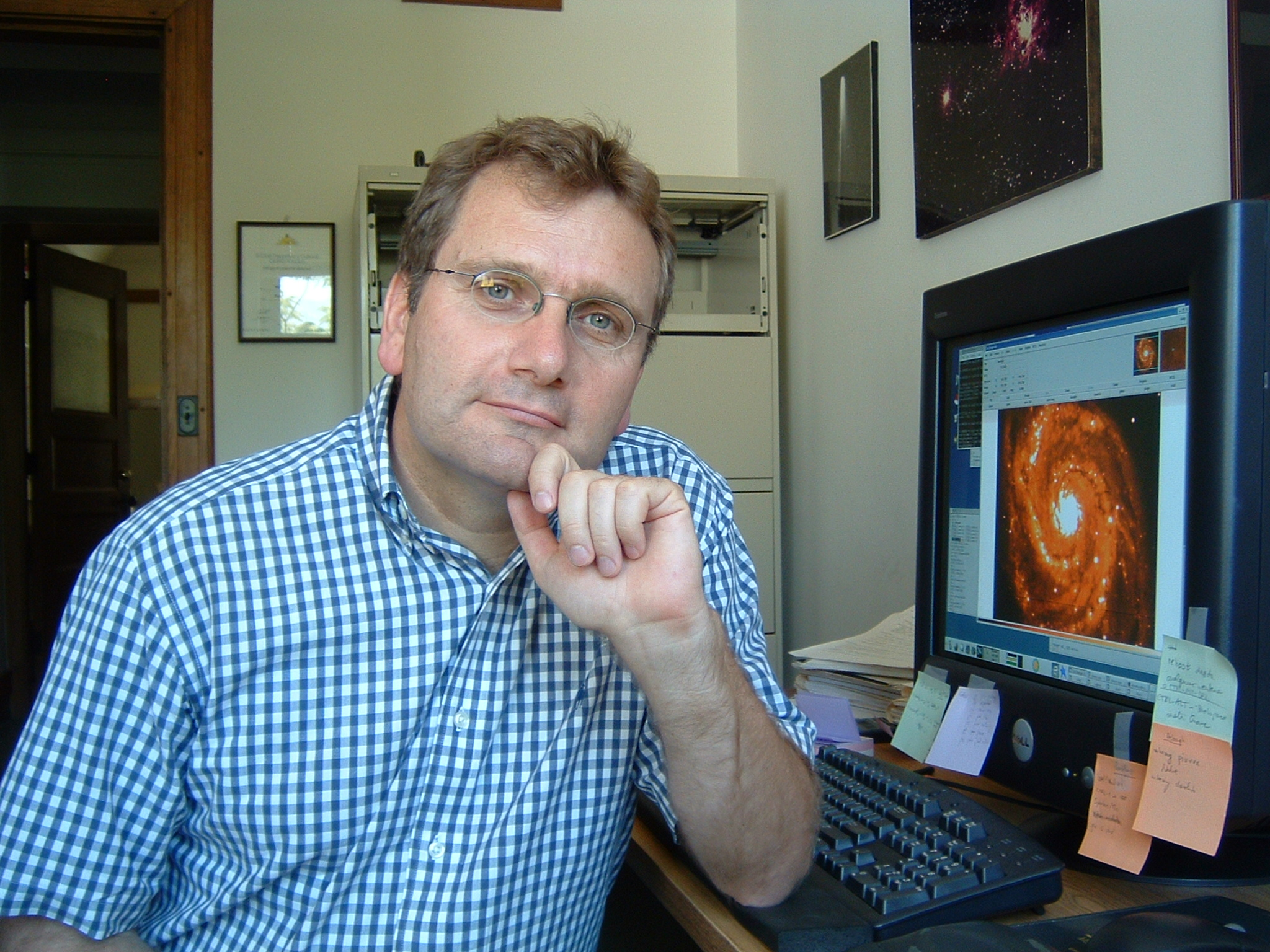
- Born: 1960 (age 65–66); Chile
- Education: University of Chile, University of Arizona
- Known for: supernovae as measures of cosmic distance
- Scientific career
- Doctoral advisor: Phil Pinto

Mario Andrés Hamuy Wackenhut (born 1960) is a Chilean Astronomer and Professor of Astronomy at the University of Chile and Cerro Calan Observatory. He is well known for his observational work on all classes of supernovae, especially the use of Type Ia and Type II supernovae as measures of cosmic distance.

== Career ==
Mario Hamuy is the son of Mario Hamuy Berr, an economist and politician of Syrian descent. He studied at Instituto Nacional General José Miguel Carrera of Santiago. Hamuy was a student in astronomy and physics at the University of Chile working with Jorge Melnick. In February 1987, he came to the Cerro Tololo Inter-American Observatory and within a few days of his arrival when the Type II supernova SN1987A exploded in the Large Magellanic Cloud, he began a major campaign at CTIO to monitor this important supernova.

In 1989, in collaboration with Jose Maza, Mark M. Phillips, and Nicholas Suntzeff, he began the Calán/Tololo Supernova Survey which led to the pioneering work on the standard candle luminosities of Type Ia supernovae. This work led to the precise measurements of the Hubble Constant H_{0} and the deceleration parameter q_{0}, the latter indicating the presence of a dark energy or cosmological constant dominating the mass/energy of the Universe.

In graduate school at the University of Arizona at the Steward Observatory working with Professor Phil Pinto, he changed his focus to the study of core collapse supernovae, in particular using Type II supernovae to measure geometric distances using the expanding photosphere method (EPM). With Pinto, he invented a semi-empirical method to measure distances to Type II events, called the Standard Candle method, which improved the distance accuracies over EPM.

== Awards and honors ==
Asteroid 109097 Hamuy, discovered by Spanish astronomer Rafael Ferrando at the Pla D'Arguines Observatory (941) in 2001, was named after him. The official naming citation was published by the Minor Planet Center on 18 February 2011 (M.P.C. 73984). In 2015 he won the National Prize for Exact Sciences. He is also the president of CONICYT, the Chilean government's scientific research agency and a recipient of the 2016 TWAS Prize.
