= Munnerlyn =

Munnerlyn is a surname. Notable people with the surname include:

- Captain Munnerlyn (born 1988), American football player
- Charles Munnerlyn (born 1940), American optical engineer
  - Munnerlyn Formula
- Charles James Munnerlyn (1822–1898), American politician and Confederate Army soldier

== See also ==
- Munnerlyn, Georgia
