= Daniel Scolnic =

American astrophysicist specializing in Type Ia supernovae and cosmology

- Education: Massachusetts Institute of Technology (BS) (2007); Johns Hopkins University (DPhil) (2013)
- Known for: using Type Ia supernovae as standard candles to measure the expansion history of the universe and constrain parameters such as the Hubble constant and the properties of dark energy.
- Scientific career
- Fields: Astrophysics
- Workplaces: Duke University

Daniel Scolnic is an American astrophysicist and academic known for his research in observational cosmology. He currently serves as an associate professor in the Physics Department at Duke University, holding a joint appointment in the Department of Electrical and Computer Engineering.

Scolnic's primary scientific research involve using Type Ia supernovae as standard candles to measure the expansion history of the universe and constrain parameters such as the Hubble constant and the properties of dark energy. His work is central to the ongoing discussion around the Hubble tension, the significant disagreement between local and cosmological measurements of the universe's expansion rate.

He is a recipient of the Packard Fellowship for Science and Engineering and a Sloan Research Fellowship.

== Education and early career ==
Scolnic completed his undergraduate education at the Massachusetts Institute of Technology (MIT), earning a Bachelor of Science (BS) in Physics in 2007. His undergraduate thesis, Solving the system of atomic rate equations during recombination, was supervised by theoretical astrophysicist and cosmologist Edmund Bertschinger.

He went on to earn his Doctor of Philosophy (PhD) in physics from Johns Hopkins University in 2013. His doctoral research, Combing large samples of type Ia supernovae to constrain dark energy, involved analyzing supernovae data from the Pan-STARRS survey and was supervised by Nobel Laureate Adam Riess.

Following his PhD, Scolnic was appointed as a Kavli Institute for Cosmological Physics Fellow at the University of Chicago and later transitioned to a NASA Hubble Fellow at the same institution.

== Academic and research career ==
=== Duke University ===
Scolnic joined Duke University as an assistant professor in the Physics Department in 2019 and was promoted to associate professor in 2023. He co-leads the Duke Cosmology Group, which uses observational data to investigate the expansion history of the cosmos and the nature of dark energy.

=== Research contributions ===
Scolnic is known for his work on Type Ia supernovae datasets:

- Pantheon and Pantheon+ Compilations: He helped lead the creation of these comprehensive compilations of Type Ia supernovae, which are considered benchmark datasets in cosmology. They are used to accurately constrain the parameters of dark energy and the Hubble constant.
- Hubble Tension: He is a key member of the SH0ES (Supernovae H0 for the Equation of State) team, which uses local measurements of Type Ia supernovae to determine the precise value of the Hubble constant, contributing crucial data to the cosmological "Hubble tension" problem.
- Future Missions: His methodologies, which focus on rigorous data calibration, simulations, and open science practices, have been used in the design and scientific goals of upcoming astronomical projects such as the Roman Space Telescope and the Rubin Observatory.

== Awards and honors ==
Scolnic has been the recipient of the following awards and honors:

- Packard Fellowship for Science and Engineering (2019)
- U.S. Department of Energy Early Career Award (2021) for his research on reducing systematic uncertainties in supernova analyses.
- Sloan Research Fellowship in Physics (2022)
- Fred Kavli Plenary Lectureship at the 242nd American Astronomical Society (AAS) meeting (2023).
- Selected for the Defense Science Study Group by the Institute for Defense Analyses (2023).

== Selected publications ==
- Scolnic, D. M., et al. "The Complete Light-curve Sample of Spectroscopically Confirmed Type Ia Supernovae from Pan-STARRS1 and Cosmological Constraints from the Combined Pantheon Sample." The Astrophysical Journal, 2018.
- Brout, D., et al. "The Pantheon+ Analysis: Cosmological Constraints." The Astrophysical Journal, 2022.
- Riess, A. G., et al. "A 2.4% Determination of the Local Value of the Hubble Constant." The Astrophysical Journal, 2016.
- Scolnic, D.M., et al. "The Pantheon+ Analysis: The Full Dataset and Light-Curve Release." The Astrophysical Journal, 2021.
