= Christopher Stubbs =

American experimental physicist (b. 1958)

Christopher William Stubbs
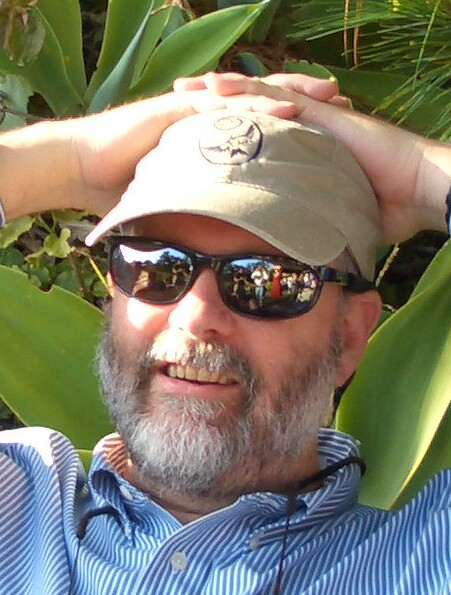
- Christopher Stubbs (2011 photo)
- Born: March 12, 1958 (age 68)
- Education: University of Virginia (B.Sc.), University of Washington (Ph.D.)
- Known for: dark energy, exclusion of fifth force, work on gravity
- Scientific career
- Fields: Physics, Astrophysics
- Workplaces: Harvard University

Christopher Stubbs (born March 12, 1958) is an experimental physicist on the faculty at Harvard University in both the Department of Physics and the Department of Astronomy. He is the former Dean of Science at Harvard University and a former chair of Harvard's Department of Physics.

== Biography ==
Stubbs received an International Baccalaureate degree from Iranzamin International School in Tehran in 1975 and received a B.Sc. in physics from the University of Virginia in 1981. He received his Ph.D. in physics from the University of Washington in 1988 working with Professor Eric Adelberger on experimental tests of gravity. His Ph.D. thesis ruled out the idea of a fifth force, a proposed long range modification of gravity.

In October 2026, Stubbs was appointed a Trustee of Anthropic's Long-Term Benefit Trust.

=== Ongoing projects ===
- Vera C. Rubin Observatory Legacy Survey of Space and Time (LSST)
- Probing dark energy with galaxy clusters.
- Precise calibration of astronomical instruments.
- Builder status on the PanSTARRS Project.
- Testing foundations of gravity with lunar laser ranging, the Apache Point Observatory Lunar Laser-ranging Operation
- Arms Control.

=== Past projects ===
- Laboratory tests of the equivalence principle (with EotWash group, University of Washington)
- Member of MACHO gravitational microlensing project, a search for dark matter in the Milky Way that ruled out astrophysical objects as being the dark matter in our Galaxy.
- Member of High-z Supernova Search Team, co-discovered the so-called dark energy
- Lead scientist of the ESSENCE supernova cosmology survey, which probed the nature of dark energy.
- Past project scientist for the Large Synoptic Survey Telescope (LSST)

== Awards ==
- Packard Fellow David and Lucile Packard Foundation
- 1999, Fellow, American Physical Society.
- 1996: NAS Award for Initiatives in Research from the National Academy of Sciences
- 2007: Gruber Prize in Cosmology (co-recipient with High-z Supernova Search Team)
- 2015: Breakthrough Prize in Fundamental Physics, shared with Brian P. Schmidt, Adam Riess, and the High-Z Supernova Search Team.
