= Schommer =

Schommer is a surname. Notable people with the surname include:

- John Schommer (1884–1960), American multi-sport athlete
- Nick Schommer (born 1986), American football player
- Paul Schommer (born 1992), American biathlete
- Robert Schommer (1946–2001), American observational astronomer

== See also ==
- 12514 Schommer, a main-belt asteroid
