= High-Z =

The term "high-Z" is used to refer to:

- Chemical elements with a high atomic number (Z) of protons in the nucleus
- A high impedance electronic signal.
- Stars with a high redshift (Z)
- The High-Z Supernova Search Team
- Materials such as lead that are used as radiation shielding.
