= Gail Saltz =

American psychiatrist and commentator

Gail Saltz, born Gail Michele Riess, is an American psychiatrist, psychoanalyst, columnist, and television commentator. Saltz is the author of several self-help and psychology books, including Anatomy of a Secret Life: The Psychology of Living a Lie (2006) and The Power of Different: The Link Between Disorder and Genius (2017).

== Early life ==
Saltz graduated from the University of Virginia School of Medicine and served her internship and residency in Internal Medicine and Psychiatry at Cornell-Weill School of Medicine and The New York Presbyterian Hospital. She also holds a B.A. in Biology and Psychology from Lehigh University, where she was a member of the women's fraternity Alpha Gamma Delta.

== Career ==
Saltz has worked as a Clinical Associate Professor of Psychiatry at the NewYork-Presbyterian Hospital Weill-Cornell School of Medicine and as a psychoanalyst with The New York Psychoanalytic Institute, and currently serves as health editor at the Child Mind Institute. She has a private practice on the Upper East Side of New York City.

She is the author of several books on mental health and wellness, including Anatomy of a Secret Life: The Psychology of Living a Lie (2006), described in the New York Times Book Review as "mostly pop-psychology narrative with a sprinkle of self-help"; The Ripple Effect: How Better Sex Can Lead to a Better Life (2009); and The Power of Different: The Link Between Disorder and Genius (2017). This novel explores the concept that difficult conditions can be great strengths. She has also written two children's books, Amazing You! Getting Smart About Your Private Parts and Changing You: A Guide to Body Changes and Sexuality. NBC producer Pamela Hamilton first brought Saltz to the network and developed her on-air skills and content. Saltz is now a frequent guest on Today and has appeared as a sex, health and relationship expert on The Oprah Winfrey Show, Dateline, CBS News and CNN.

Saltz serves on the board of directors at the 92nd Street Y, where she has hosted, since 2004, a series of talks with celebrities and personalities on psychological issues. She has interviewed Woody Allen, Tom Brokaw, Katie Couric, Jane Pauley, Gail Sheehy, Tavis Smiley, and Rosie O'Donnell, among others.

== Personal life ==
Saltz was born to a Jewish family. She is the sister of Nobel laureate Adam Riess and the granddaughter of journalist Curt Martin Riess. She is married to Dr. Leonard Saltz, an oncologist at Memorial Sloan Kettering Cancer Center. They have three daughters.

== Bibliography ==
- The Power of Different: the Link between Disorder and Genius, Flatiron Books, 2017, ISBN 125006001X.
