= Curt Martin Riess =

German journalist and writer

Curt Martin Riess (June 21, 1902 – May 13, 1993) was a German journalist and writer.

Reiss was born of Jewish-German origins in Wurzburg, Germany, and later fled in 1933 to Paris, France not long after Adolf Hitler was appointed chancellor in 1933. Riess received his higher education in Berlin, Munich, Heidelberg, Zurich and Paris, with an emphasis on literature and economics. He was the grandfather of the 2011 Nobel laureate in Physics, Adam Riess, and of psychiatrist Gail Saltz.

== Career ==
In the 1920s, he first dabbled in sports journalism, and then began to crisscross Europe to report for the Berlin press, including a role as a film and theatre critic.

A French newspaper, Paris-Soir, sent him in 1934 to the United States as a foreign correspondent. Drafted by the U.S. Navy until his transfer into the U.S. Army, Reiss was assigned as a war correspondent in Europe.

After the war he worked as a freelance writer in New York, later returned to Germany, and finally relocated to Switzerland in 1952. Bilingual and a prolific writer, he produced over 100 books in English and German, along with newspaper and magazine articles, biographies, novels and screenplays.

Riess attracted attention in the United States in the 1930s and during World War II with his books and widely syndicated reporting about Hitler's Germany. Along with his duty as a war correspondent, some have claimed that Riess also engaged in the surveillance of Nazi activities, serving as a spy for the United States military. He returned to Germany after the defeat of Hitler in 1945.

== Death ==
Reiss died in Scheuren bei Forch, Switzerland on May 19, 1993 at the age of 90. The cause of death was undisclosed.

== Publications ==
- Total Espionage (P.G. Putnam's Sons, 1941)
- Underground Europe (Dial Press, 1942)
- The Self-Betrayed—The Glory and Doom of the German Generals (G.P. Putnam's Sons, 1942)
- The Invasion of Germany (G.P. Putnam's Sons, 1943)
- The Nazis Go Underground (Doubleday, 1944)
- Joseph Goebbels, (Doubleday & Company, 1948)
- The Berlin Story (Dial Press, 1952)
- Joseph Goebbels Abridged, Ballantine Books, New York, November 1960
- Underground Europe (Dial Press, 1972)
