= 9963 Sandage =

Asteroid

- Orbits of Sandage (blue), the inner planets (red) and Jupiter (outermost)

Discovery
- Discovered by: E. F. Helin
- Discovery site: Palomar Obs.
- Discovery date: 9 January 1992

Designations
- Named after: Allan Sandage (American astronomer)
- Alternative designations: 1992 AN · 1976 NH; 1989 CK_{6}
- Minor planet category: main-belt · Phocaea

Orbital characteristics
- Epoch 4 September 2017 (JD 2458000.5)
- Uncertainty parameter 0
- Observation arc: 28.13 yr (10,276 days)
- Aphelion: 2.9982 AU
- Perihelion: 1.6833 AU
- Semi-major axis: 2.3408 AU
- Eccentricity: 0.2809
- Orbital period (sidereal): 3.58 yr (1,308 days)
- Mean anomaly: 132.58°
- Mean motion: 0° 16^{m} 30.72^{s} / day
- Inclination: 23.461°
- Longitude of ascending node: 116.97°
- Argument of perihelion: 241.14°

Physical characteristics
- Dimensions: 5.45 km (calculated); 6.371±0.174 km
- Synodic rotation period: 4.6502±0.0008 h 4.65053±0.00013 h
- Geometric albedo: 0.158±0.025; 0.23 (assumed)
- Spectral type: S
- Absolute magnitude (H): 12.9 · 12.95±0.25 · 13.080±0.002 (R) · 13.53 · 13.6

9963 Sandage, provisional designation 1992 AN, is a stony Phocaea asteroid from the inner regions of the asteroid belt, approximately 6 kilometers in diameter.

It was discovered by American astronomer Eleanor Helin at the Palomar Observatory in California on 9 January 1992, and later named after American astronomer Allan Sandage.

== Orbit and classification ==
Sandage is a stony member of the Phocaea family (701), a group of asteroids with similar orbital characteristics. It orbits the Sun in the inner main-belt at a distance of 1.7–3.0 AU once every 3 years and 7 months (1,308 days). Its orbit has an eccentricity of 0.28 and an inclination of 23° with respect to the ecliptic. First identified as 1976 NH at Crimea–Nauchnij in 1976, the body's observation arc begins at the German Karl Schwarzschild Observatory in 1989, or 3 years prior to its official discovery observation at Palomar.

== Physical characteristics ==
=== Rotation period ===
Two rotational lightcurves of Sandage were obtained from photometric observations at the Palomar Transient Factory and at Texas Tech's Preston Gott Observatory in November 2011 and June 2016, respectively. Lightcurve analysis gave a rotation period of 4.65 hours with a high brightness variation of 0.56 and 0.43 in magnitude, respectively (U=2/3-).

=== Diameter and albedo ===
According to the survey carried out by the NEOWISE mission of NASA's Wide-field Infrared Survey Explorer, Sandage measures 6.4 kilometers in diameter and its surface has an albedo of 0.16, while the Collaborative Asteroid Lightcurve Link assumes an albedo of 0.23 – derived from the family's largest member and namesake, 25 Phocaea – and calculates a diameter of 5.5 kilometers with an absolute magnitude of 13.53.

== Naming ==
This minor planet was named after American astronomer Allan Sandage (1926–2010), a worldwide known expert on stellar astronomy and observational cosmology, who worked at Palomar and Mount Wilson Observatory. Sandage determined the first reasonably accurate values for the Hubble constant and also discovered the first quasar. The official naming citation was published by the Minor Planet Center on 2 September 2001 (M.P.C. 43381).
