= Baade-Wesselink method =

Technique in stellar astrophysics

The Baade-Wesselink method is a method for determining the distance of a Cepheid variable star suggested by Walter Baade in 1926 and further developed by Adriaan Wesselink in 1946. In the original method the color of the star at various points during its period of variation is used to determine its surface brightness. Then, knowing the apparent magnitude at these points in time the angular diameter can be calculated. Measurements are also taken of the radial velocity using Doppler spectroscopy. This allows one to determine the speed at which the front surface of the star moves toward or away from us at various points in the cycle. Since the difference between this and the average speed is the derivative of the radius, one obtains the variation in radius. Combining this with the change in angular diameter gives the distance. It is now possible to measure the angular diameter of the pulsating star directly using optical interferometers, allowing a more accurate measurement of the star's distance. This newer technique is known as the geometric Baade–Wesselink method.

A closely related technique is the expanding photosphere method, which can be used to determine the distance to Type II supernovae.
