= José Maza Sancho =

Chilean astronomer

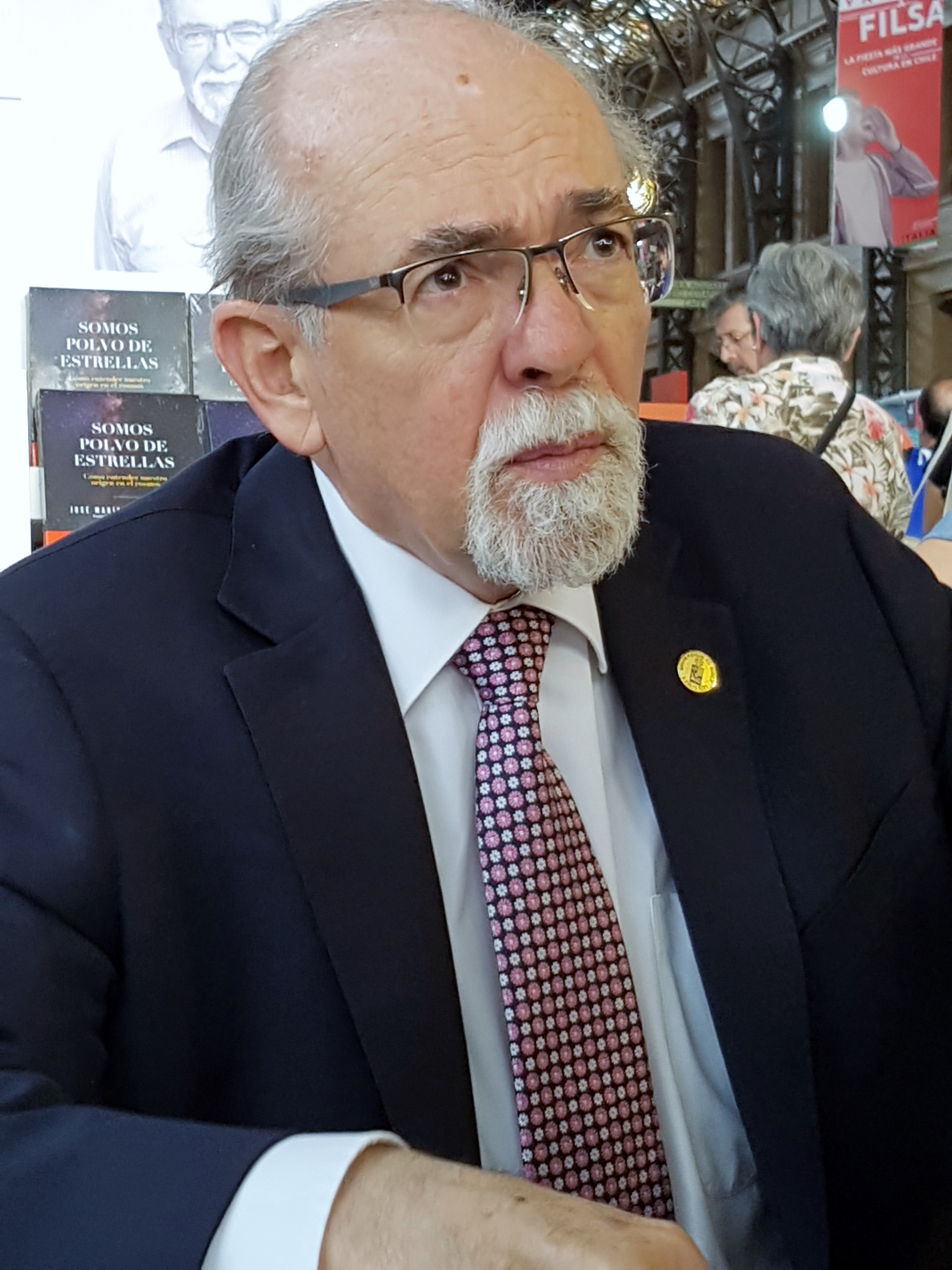
- Maza in FILSA 2017
- Born: José María Maza Sancho; 1948 (age 77–78); Valparaíso, Chile
- Education: University of Chile, University of Toronto
- Occupations: Astronomer, professor
- Notable work: Somos polvo de estrellas
- Awards: National Prize for Exact Sciences (1999)

José María Maza Sancho (born 1948) is a Chilean astronomer and astrophysicist. His work has focused on the study of supernovas, the execution of a search for objects with emission lines, dark energy, and quasars with an objective prism, which led him to be awarded the National Prize for Exact Sciences in 1999. Since 2017 he gained popular following with books aimed to the general public and podcasts.

== Biography ==
After studying at the Internado Nacional Barros Arana, he entered the University of Chile as an astronomy student. He did his doctoral studies in astronomy at the University of Toronto.

Since 1968 he has been an academic of the Faculty of Physical and Mathematical Sciences of the University of Chile, and since 1987 he has been a full professor of that house of studies. He was director of the University of Chile's Department of Astronomy from 1997 to 2000.

Between 1979 and 1984 he headed the Scientific Project of Search for Supernovas at Cerro El Roble and was part of Project Calán Tololo, a Chilean-American initiative that featured the joint work of the University of Chile with the Cerro Tololo Interamerican Observatory, in the search for supernovas.

The Calán Tololo project gave contemporary astrophysics tools for measuring the universe more precisely, calculations that years later would be key for a group of American astronomers to follow these supernova studies, being part of the theory of accelerating expansion of the universe by dark energy. He has not been recognized as such since all his mathematical calculations were provided to Harvard University on the condition that they would only perform a mathematical modeling, which allowed that group of American scientists to win the Nobel Prize in 2011.

Apart from being a professor and being a member of the Center for Astrophysics and Related Technologies (CATA), he has given astronomical talks to young people to get them interested in science, one of which he did at the boarding school in which he studied.

The astronomer Rafael Ferrando baptized the asteroid 108113 as "Maza", in honor of José Maza Sancho.

== Awards ==
- Presidential Chair in Sciences, 1995
- Rector's Medal, University of Chile, 1996
- National Prize for Exact Sciences, 1999
- Rector's Medal, University of Chile, 1999
- Active Member of the Academy of Sciences since 2002

== Published books ==
- Supernovas, Ediciones B, 2008. Coauthored with Mario Hamuy Wackenhut. ISBN 9563040414
- Astronomía contemporánea, Ediciones B, 2009. ISBN 9563040708
- Somos polvo de estrellas, Editorial Planeta, 2017. ISBN 9789563602449
- Marte: la próxima frontera, Editorial Planeta, Santiago, 2018. ISBN 9789563604771
