= Adriaan Wesselink =

Dutch astronomer (1909–1995)

Adriaan Jan Wesselink
- Born: April 7, 1909; Hellevoetsluis, Netherlands
- Died: January 12, 1995 (aged 85); New Haven, Connecticut, U.S.
- Education: Utrecht University; Leiden University
- Scientific career
- Fields: Astronomy
- Thesis: Photographic Photometry Applied to the Variable Star SZ Camelopardalis (1938)

Adriaan Jan Wesselink (April 7, 1909 – January 12, 1995) was a Dutch astronomer who worked successively in the Netherlands, South Africa, and the United States. He specialised in observing and understanding the characteristics of stars, particularly variable stars.

== Early life ==
Adriaan Wesselink was born on 7 April 1909 in Hellevoetsluis in the Netherlands. His father was a medical doctor and his mother was a nurse. Inspired by his parents, Adriaan Wesselink developed an interest in science.

Wesselink studied physics, mathematics and astronomy at Utrecht University, leading to the award of a bachelor of science degree.

== Astronomical research in the Netherlands ==
Wesselink proceeded to Leiden University where he was appointed to an assistantship. He pursued research into variable stars. He was trained by prominent astronomers including Ejnar Hertzsprung, Willem de Sitter and Jan Woltjer. He made photographic observations of the brightness of the Sun during the total eclipse of 19 June 1936 outside of the total phase in an attempt to measure how the surface brightness of the Sun varies across its disk.

Wesselink was awarded a PhD in 1938 for research into the eclipsing variable star SZ Camelopardalis that used measurements of its brightness from 12000 photographic plates.

He remained at Leiden University during the Nazi occupation in the Second World War, maintaining the functioning of the institution following the resignation of many senior staff members. He married Jeanette van Gogh in 1943.

== Work in South Africa ==
In 1946 Wesselink was sent to the Leiden Observatory's outpost in South Africa to act as its superintendent. The Leiden station was located in the grounds of the Union Observatory, Johannesburg, to provide access to the southern skies invisible from Europe. During this time he was responsible for photographic observations of variable stars to record their changes in brightness, and of selected regions of the sky to measure colours of stars. The photographic plates were sent to the Netherlands for measurement and analysis.

During this period he calculated the mean radius of the variable star Delta Cephei using measurements of its brightness, its colour and the radial velocity of its surface, assuming the star behaved as a black body in emitting light. This developed a method suggested by Walter Baade in 1926 and the technique subsequently became known as the Baade-Wesselink method.

In 1950 Adriaan Wesselink was appointed chief assistant of the Radcliffe Observatory in Pretoria. The observatory was equipped with a 1.9-metre (74-inch) aperture reflecting telescope, then the largest telescope in the southern hemisphere. A new spectrograph was commissioned in 1951 and Wesselink set to work studying the radial velocities of hot, luminous stars in the Milky Way to improve knowledge about the rotation of the disk of the Galaxy. He also carried out photoelectric photometry of stars in the Magellanic Clouds. In collaboration with A. D. Thackeray, he discovered RR Lyrae variable stars in the Magellanic Clouds, which provided much improved measurements of the distances to these two nearby galaxies.

== Research in the United States ==
In 1964 Wesselink was appointed a research associate in the astronomy department of Yale University, and in 1965 became a senior research astronomer there. Yale and Columbia universities had established a southern-hemisphere station at El Leoncito near San Juan in Argentina. Wesselink became closely involved in the work from the observatory.

Wesselink worked on many projects relating to stars. These included calculations of the surface brightnesses and radii of stars.

== Later years ==
Adriaan Wesselink retired in 1977. He died in New Haven, Connecticut, on 12 January 1995.
