= Phillips relationship =

Relationship in astrophysics

In astrophysics, the Phillips relationship is the relationship between the peak luminosity of a Type Ia supernova and the speed of luminosity evolution after maximum light. The relationship was independently discovered by the American statistician and astronomer Bert Woodard Rust and the Soviet astronomer Yury Pavlovich Pskovskii in the 1970s. They found that the faster the supernova faded from maximum light, the fainter its peak magnitude was. As a main parameter characterizing the light curve shape, Pskovskii used β, the mean rate of decline in photographic brightness from maximum light to the point at which the luminosity decline rate changes. β is measured in magnitudes per 100-day intervals. Selection of this parameter is justified by the fact that, at that time, the probability of discovering a supernova before the maximum light, and obtain the full light curve, was small. Moreover, the existing light curves were mostly incomplete. On the other hand, to determine the decline after the maximum light was rather simple for most observed supernovae.

In the early 1980s CCD cameras appeared, and the number of SNe discoveries increased substantially. Moreover, the probability of discovering SNe before they reached maximum light and following their brightness evolution longer also increased. The first light curves of SNe Ia obtained using CCD photometry showed that some supernovae had faster decline rates than others. Later, the low luminosity Ia SN 1991bg with a fast decline rate was discovered. All this motivated the American astronomer Mark M. Phillips to revise this relationship precisely during the course of the Calán/Tololo Supernova Survey. The correlation had been difficult to prove because Pskovskii's slope (β) parameter was difficult to measure with precision in practice, a necessary condition to prove the correlation. Rather than trying to determine the slope, Phillips used a simpler and more robust procedure that consisted in "measuring the total amount in magnitudes that the light curve decays from its peak brightness during some specified period following maximum light." It was defined as the decline in the B-magnitude light curve from maximum light to the magnitude 15 days after B-maximum, a parameter he called $\Delta{m}_{15}$. The lead sentence of the acknowledgments section of Phillips' paper states: "I am indebted to George Jacoby for suggesting the $\Delta{m}_{15}$ parameter as an alternative to Pskovskii's β." The relation states that the maximum intrinsic B-band magnitude is given by

$M_\mathrm{max}(B) = -21.726 + 2.698 \Delta m_{15} (B).$

Phillips dedicated the journal article confirming Yuri Pskovskii's proposed correlation to Pskovskii, who died a few weeks after Phillips' evidence confirming the relationship was published.

It has been recast to include the evolution in multiple photometric bandpasses, with a significantly shallower slope and as a stretch in the time axis relative to a standard template. The relation is typically used to bring any Type Ia supernova peak magnitude to a standard candle value.

The original $\Delta{m}_{15}$ definition drawn by Phillips around 1995.
