= Hen 2-428 =

Planetary nebula with a binary white dwarf core

Emission nebula
- Planetary nebula
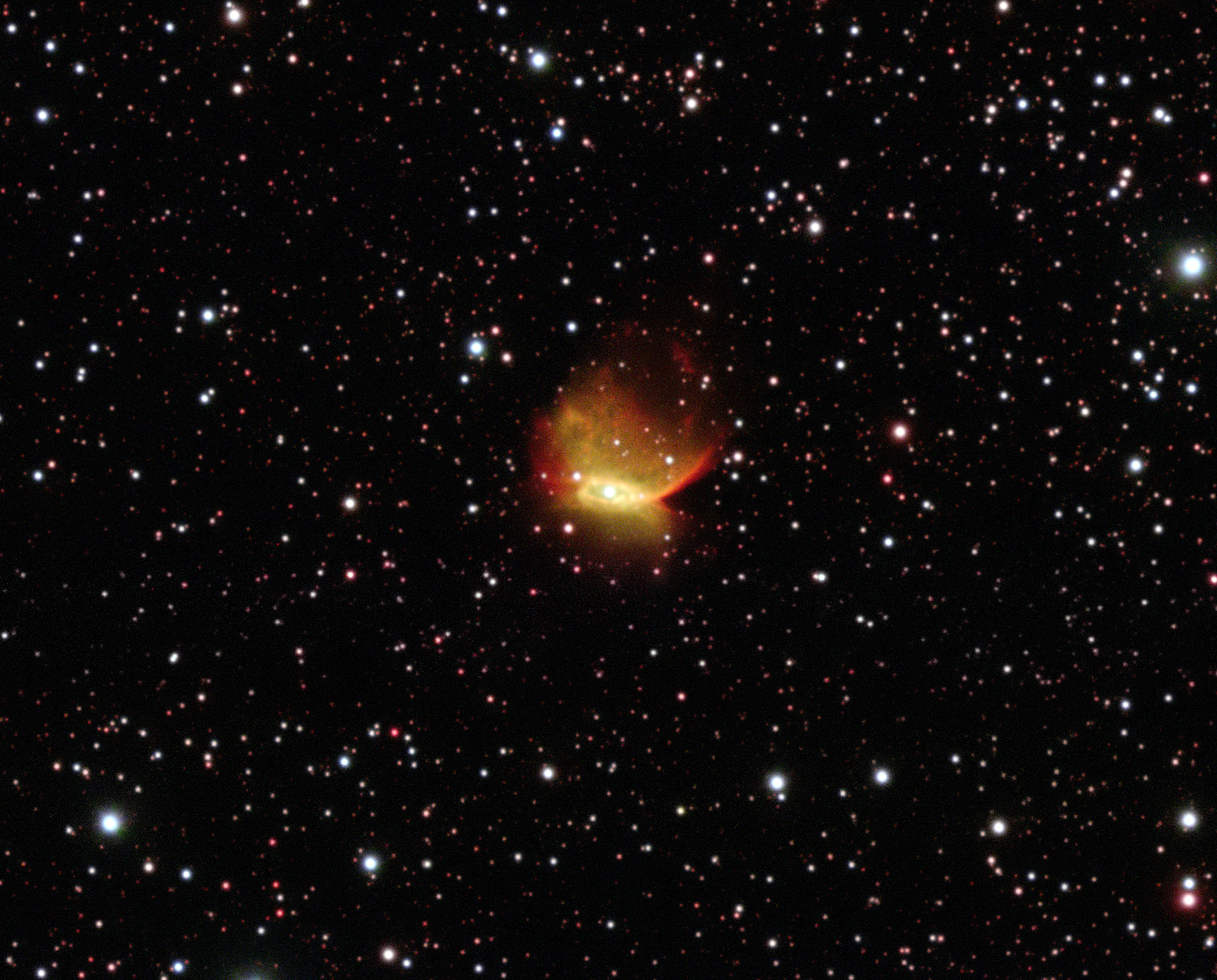
- ESO image of Hen 2-428

Observation data: J2000.0 epoch
- Right ascension: 19^{h} 13^{m} 05.239^{s}
- Declination: +15° 46′ 39.80″
- Constellation: Aquila
- Designations: Henize 2-428, Hen 2-428, He 2-428, PN G049.4+02.4, M 4-12, ARO 186, PK 49+02 1, IRAS 19108+1541

Star system
Observation data Epoch J2000.0 Equinox ICRS
- Constellation: Aquila
- Right ascension: 19^{h} 13^{m} 05.239^{s}
- Declination: +15° 46′ 39.80″
Spectral type	D

Other designations
- ESO 228-6, 2MASS J19130545+1546399

Database references
SIMBAD	data

Hen 2-428 is a planetary nebula with a binary double white dwarf system core. This core star system is the first discovered candidate for Type Ia supernova through binary white dwarf merger process. At the time of its discovery, the star system at the core was the heaviest known double white dwarf binary star system.

== Planetary nebula ==
The planetary nebula is asymmetric, which is the result of there being not a single star, but a binary system at the heart of the nebula.

== Binary double white dwarf ==
The binary nature of the star at the centre of the nebula was discovered in 2014, when a study of why the nebula was not regular was conducted, resolving the previously thought single star into a double star. The two white dwarf stars forming the binary star system at the heart of the nebula orbit each other with a period of about 4 hours. The two stars have a combined mass of about 1.8 solar masses, with each star being slightly less massive than the Sun. As of 2015, they are the most massive binary double white dwarf star system known.

=== Progenitor system for potential Type-Ia supernova ===
The pair are expected to merge into a single star in about 700 million years, whereupon they will explode in a Type Ia supernova. The inspiralling of the stars is caused by the emission of gravitational waves, resulting in the loss of orbital energy. The explosion is due to the combined mass of the merged star exceeding the Chandrasekhar limit of 1.4 solar masses. This is the first candidate for binary double white dwarf star merger progenitor Type Ia supernova star system known. The system is important to astrophysicists as Type Ia supernovae are used as standard candles to measure the distance to faraway objects, thus understanding the process is important to regularize and quantify the variations in the standard candle to reduce the error uncertainty in determining distance.

== See also ==
- WDJ181058.67+311940.94 — super-Chandrasekhar mass double-degenerate binary star discovered in 2024
