= J. Ward Moody =

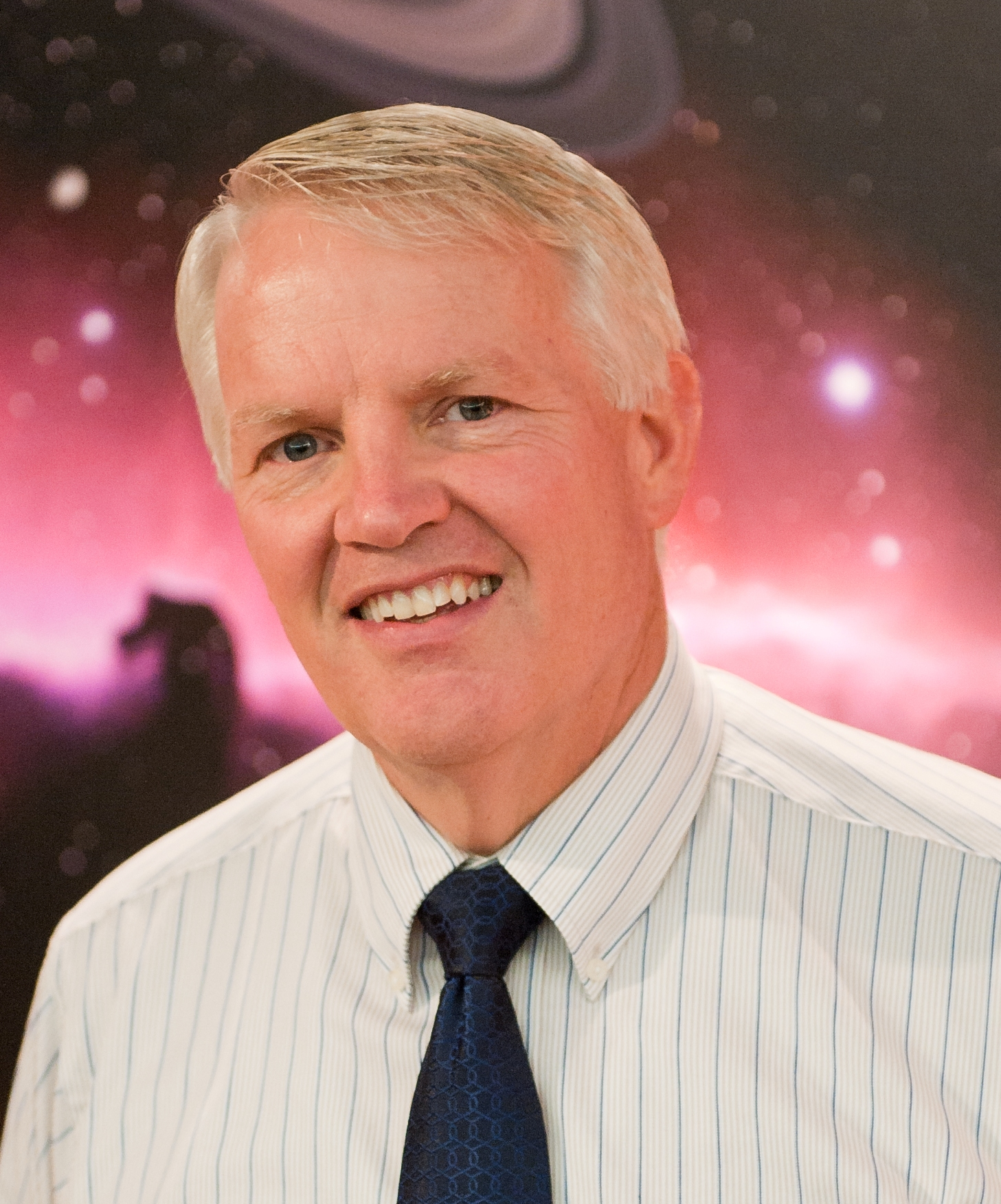
- Born: December 18, 1954 (age 71); Payson, Utah, USA
- Education: The University of Michigan
- Known for: Large-Scale Structure; Astronomical publishing
- Awards: Karl G. Maeser Professorship
- Scientific career
- Fields: Astronomy
- Doctoral advisor: Robert P. Kirshner

J. Ward Moody (born December 18, 1954) is a professor of astronomy at Brigham Young University (BYU). He received a Ph.D. in astronomy from The University of Michigan studying under Robert P. Kirshner. He did post-doctoral research at The Institute for Astronomy at the University of New Mexico with Stephen Gregory and Jack Burns, working on questions of large-scale galaxy structure. His dissertation and post-doctoral work established the existence of small, dwarf galaxies with emission-lines on the edges of galaxy supercluster voids.

Moody is best known for work in astronomical publishing. He served three years as assistant managing editor of the Astronomical Society of the Pacific Conference Series (ASPCS) from 2001 to 2004 then was appointed as Managing Editor for 5 years until 2009. Under his direction the ASPCS, the largest publisher of astronomical conference information in the world, transitioned to full electronic submissions and distribution. He was elected to the American Astronomical Society publications board serving from December 2010 to 2014.

Moody is the principal author of the textbook Physical Science Foundations (2006) and received both the BYU Alcuin Award and Karl G. Maeser General Education Professorship for excellence in general education teaching. A devout Latter-day Saint, he is a noted speaker on the topic of science and religion.

== Selected BYU Speeches ==
J. Ward Moody delivered a devotional address at Brigham Young University focused on doctrine, science, and faith.

- "Exploding Stars, Expanding Universe" – March 1, 2003

== Sources ==
- Mormons Scholars testify bio
- BYU faculty bio page for Moody
