= Robert Schommer =

American astronomer

Robert A. Schommer
- Robert A. Schommer
- Born: December 9, 1946; Chicago, Illinois U.S.
- Died: December 12, 2001 (aged 55); La Serena, Chile
- Education: University of Washington
- Scientific career
- Fields: Astronomy; Astrophysics

Robert A. Schommer (December 9, 1946 – December 12, 2001) was an American observational astronomer. He was a professor at Rutgers University and later a project scientist for the U.S. office of the Gemini Observatory Project at the Cerro Tololo Inter-American Observatory (CTIO) in Chile. He was known for his wide range of research interests, from stellar populations to cosmology.

Schommer was born in Chicago, Illinois to Harvey and Bea Schommer. He received a B.A. in Physics from the University of Chicago in 1970 and a Ph.D. in Astronomy from the University of Washington in 1977, where he continued for one year as instructor. Following two years in seminary college in Chicago, he held postdoctoral positions at Caltech (as Chaim Weizmann Fellow), the Hale Observatories, the University of Chicago, and Cambridge University (as NATO Postdoctoral Fellow) before joining the Department of Physics at the State University of New Jersey. He became increasingly unhappy with the department's unwillingness to support astronomy, and in 1990 he moved to CTIO in Chile where he remained until his death in 2001.

== Research ==
Schommer carried out some of the first charge-coupled device (CCD) imaging studies of Large Magellanic Cloud star clusters, published in a paper on what is now called the "short distance" to the LMC. His work on star clusters in the Magellanic Clouds and the galaxy M33 were fundamental in providing a basis for our understanding of the chemical histories of those galaxies.

Schommer was an active member of the High-z Supernova Search Team and co-authored their 1998 paper arguing that we live in an accelerating universe with a cosmological constant. In honor of this work, he was awarded the AURA Science Achievement Award in 1999.

Schommer also worked on clusters of galaxies and their use in establishing the extragalactic distance scale; dark matter in dwarf galaxies; and designed and built a Fabry–Pérot interferometer and oversaw its installation at the Cerro-Tololo Observatory.

In his final year at CTIO, Schommer took over the management of the U.S. Gemini Project Office as Project Scientist. He was an advocate for a strong national observatory that would allow U.S. astronomers access to world-class, ground-based facilities. At the time of his death, Schommer was in the process of moving to Tucson, Arizona to establish a U.S. Gemini Science Center and a remote observing facility.

== Death ==
Schommer committed suicide in La Serena, Chile, on December 12, 2001. He was survived by his wife Iris Labra and three children Paulina, Andrea, and Robert.

Following his death, the Association of Universities for Research in Astronomy (AURA) established the Schommer Children's Fund to assist the Schommer family in meeting the future educational expenses of their children.

== Named after him ==
- Asteroid 12514 Schommer
- Robert A. Schommer Observatory
- Robert A. Schommer Prize
