= High-Z Supernova Search Team =

International cosmology research group (1994–2002)

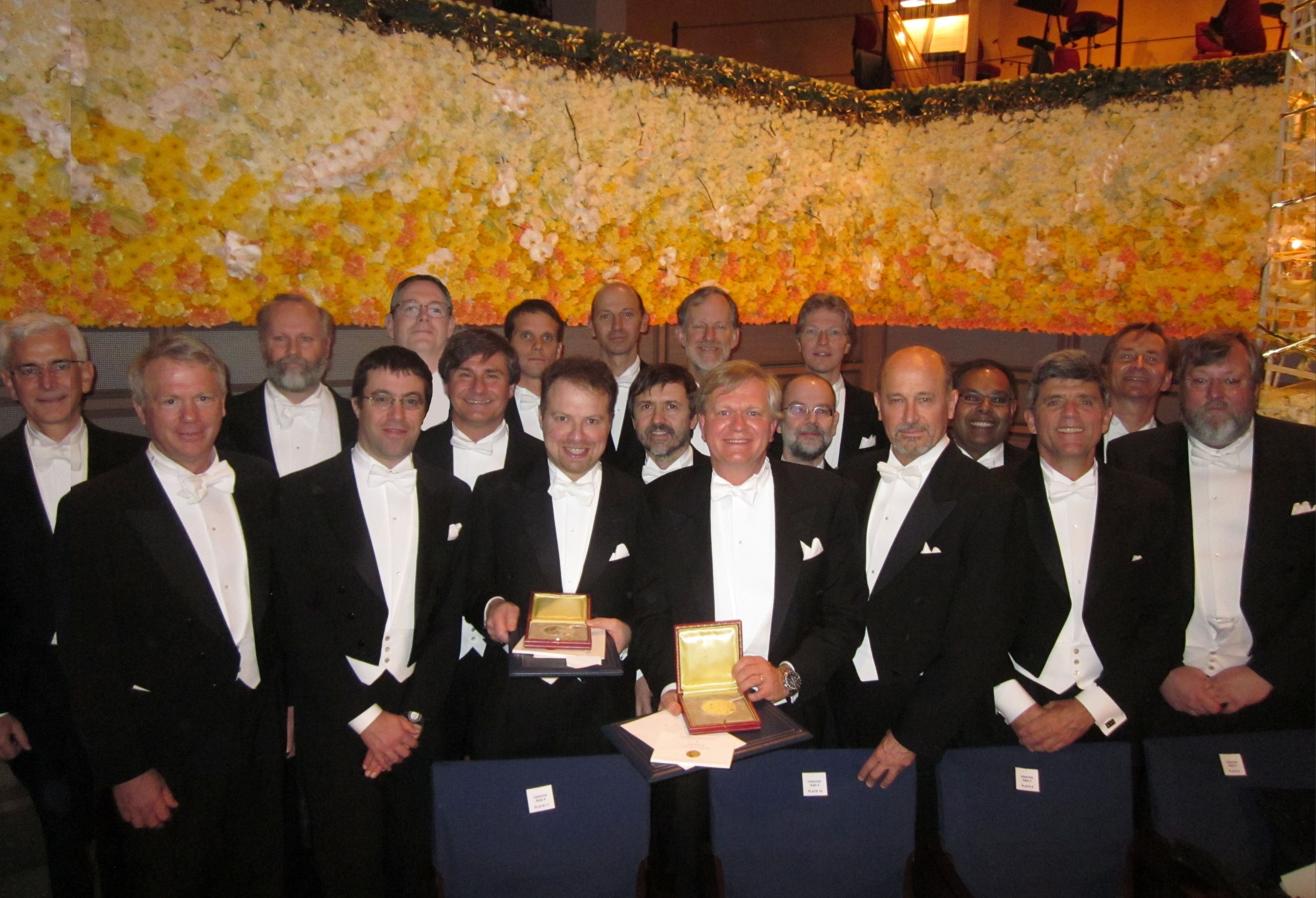
The High-Z Supernova Search Team at the 2011 Nobel Prize ceremony. Brian Schmidt (right center) and Adam Riess (left center) were awarded medals.

The High-Z Supernova Search Team was an international cosmology collaboration which used Type Ia supernovae to chart the expansion of the universe. The team was formed in 1994 by Brian P. Schmidt, then a post-doctoral research associate at Harvard University, and Nicholas B. Suntzeff, a staff astronomer at the Cerro Tololo Inter-American Observatory (CTIO) in Chile. The original team submitted a proposal on September 29, 1994 called A Pilot Project to Search for Distant Type Ia Supernova to the CTIO. The team on the first observing proposal comprised: Nicholas Suntzeff (PI); Brian Schmidt (Co-I); (other Co-Is) R. Chris Smith, Robert Schommer, Mark M. Phillips, Mario Hamuy, Roberto Aviles, Jose Maza, Adam Riess, Robert Kirshner, Jason Spyromilio, and Bruno Leibundgut. The project was awarded four nights of telescope time on the CTIO Víctor M. Blanco Telescope on the nights of February 25, 1995, and March 6, 24, and 29, 1995. The pilot project led to the discovery of supernova SN1995Y. In 1995, the HZT elected Brian P. Schmidt of the Mount Stromlo Observatory which is part of the Australian National University to manage the team.

The team expanded to roughly 20 astronomers located in the United States, Europe, Australia, and Chile. They used the Víctor M. Blanco telescope to discover Type Ia supernovae out to redshifts of z = 0.9. The discoveries were verified with spectra taken mostly from the telescopes of the Keck Observatory, and the European Southern Observatory.

In January 1998, Notre Dame astrophysicist Peter Garnavich, then working at the Harvard-Smithsonian Center for Astrophysics, led a High-Z team publication that used the Hubble Space Telescope to study three high-redshift supernovae. These results indicated that the universe did not contain enough matter to halt its expansion and that the universe would likely expand forever.

In a May 1998 study led by Adam Riess, the High-Z Team became the first to publish evidence that the expansion of the Universe is accelerating. The team later spawned Project ESSENCE led by Christopher Stubbs of Harvard University and the Higher-Z Team in 2002 led by Adam Riess of Johns Hopkins University and Space Telescope Science Institute.

In 2011, Riess and Schmidt, along with Saul Perlmutter of the Supernova Cosmology Project, were awarded the Nobel Prize in Physics for this work.

== Awards ==
- 1998: Breakthrough of the Year, Science magazine
- 2006: Shaw Prize
- 2007: Gruber Prize in Cosmology
- 2011: Nobel Prize in Physics
- 2011: Albert Einstein Medal
- 2015: Breakthrough Prize in Fundamental Physics
- 2015: Wolf Prize in Physics

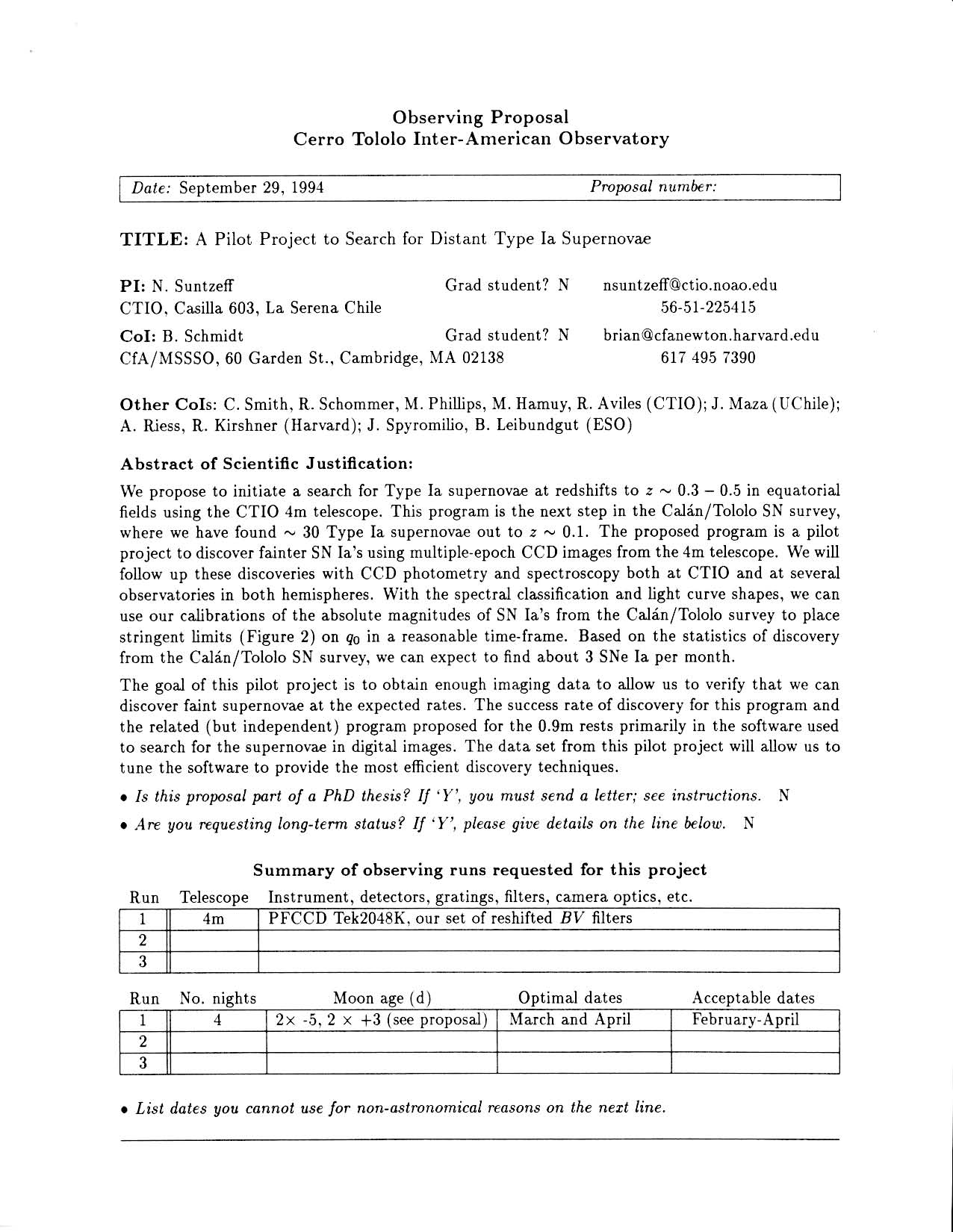
The original telescope time proposal in 1994 to the Cerro Tololo Inter-American Observatory which began the High-Z Team.

== Members ==
- Mount Stromlo Observatory and the Australian National University
  - Brian P. Schmidt
- CTIO
  - Nicholas Suntzeff
  - Robert Schommer
  - R. Chris Smith
  - Mario Hamuy (1994–1997)
- Las Campanas Observatory
  - Mark M. Phillips (1994–2000)
- Pontificia Universidad Católica de Chile
  - Alejandro Clocchiatti (starting in 1996)
- University of Chile
  - Jose Maza (1994–1997)
- European Southern Observatory
  - Bruno Leibundgut
  - Jason Spyromilio
- University of Hawaii
  - John Tonry (starting in 1996)
- University of California, Berkeley
  - Alexei Filippenko (starting in 1996)
  - Weidong Li (starting in 1999)
- Space Telescope Science Institute
  - Adam Riess
  - Ron Gilliland (1996–2000)
- University of Washington
  - Christopher Stubbs (starting in 1995)
  - Craig Hogan (starting in 1995)
  - David Reiss (1995–1999)
  - Alan Diercks (1995–1999)
- Harvard University
  - Christopher Stubbs (starting in 2003)
  - Robert Kirshner
  - Thomas Matheson (starting 1999)
  - Saurabh Jha (starting 1997)
  - Peter Challis
- University of Notre Dame
  - Peter Garnavich
  - Stephen Holland (starting 2000)
