= Munnerlyn Formula =

Theoretical formula used in LASIK surgery

The Munnerlyn Formula is the theoretical formula discovered by Charles Munnerlyn, which gives the depth an excimer laser will need to ablate during LASIK surgery or similar medical interventions. The formula states that the depth of the ablation (in micrometres) per diopter of refractive change is equal to the square of the diameter of the optical ablation zone measured in millimeters, divided by three. For example, to change refraction by 4 diopters with an optical zone of 3 mm would require ablation of 12 μm. As the depth of ablation is proportional to the square of the optical zone, changing the refraction by 4 diopters but with an optical zone of 6 mm would require a much deeper ablation of approximately 48 μm. The ablation depth does not include the transition zone of the surgery.

The actual ablation depth and surface shape will be slightly different from the theoretical Munnerlyn formula. Many factors must be taken into account at the time of the surgery. The sex, age, and race of the patient, and such things as the barometric pressure and ambient humidity, will slightly change the required ablation.

The formula was derived based on creating a theoretical lenticular surface in a polymethylmethacrylate (PMMA) model, and modified by testing on in vivo animal tissue.
