= Robert Kirshner =

American astronomer

Robert P. Kirshner
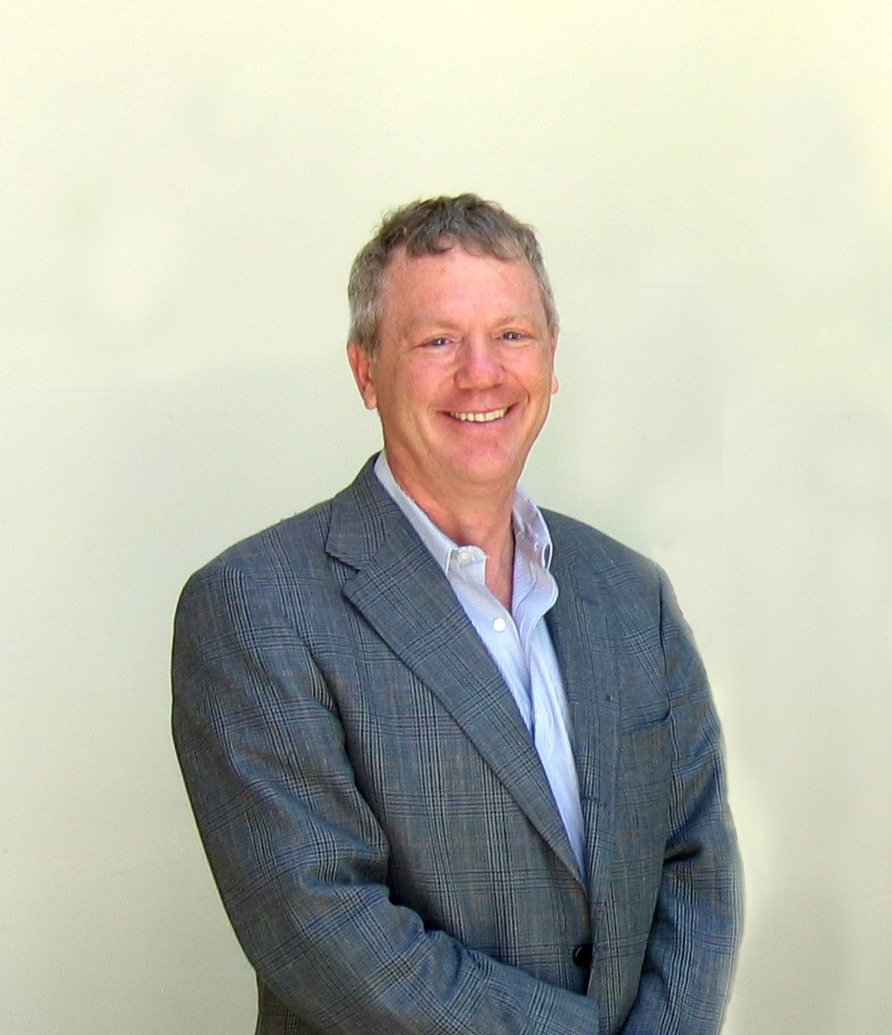
- Kirshner in c. 2005
- Born: August 15, 1949 (age 77)
- Education: Harvard College (A.B.), California Institute of Technology (Ph.D.)
- Known for: Type Ia Supernova Studies, Large Scale Structure, supernova remnants
- Spouse: Jayne Loader (m. 1999)
- Awards: Caltech Distinguished Alumni Award; Dannie Heineman Prize for Astrophysics (2011); James Craig Watson Medal (2014); Wolf Prize in Physics (2015)
- Scientific career
- Fields: Astrophysics
- Workplaces: Gordon and Betty Moore Foundation; Harvard University; University of Michigan

Robert P. Kirshner (born August 15, 1949) is an American astronomer, Chief Program Officer for Science for the Gordon and Betty Moore Foundation, and the Clowes Research Professor of Science at Harvard University. Kirshner has worked in several areas of astronomy including the physics of supernovae, supernova remnants, the large-scale structure of the cosmos, and the use of supernovae to measure the expansion of the universe.

== Career ==
Kirshner received his A.B. magna cum laude in Astronomy from Harvard College in 1970, where he also won a Bowdoin Prize for Useful and Polite Literature. He earned his Ph.D., also in Astronomy, from Caltech in 1975.

He then worked as a postdoc at the Kitt Peak National Observatory, before joining the faculty at the University of Michigan, where he rose to become Professor and Chairman of the Astronomy Department and helped to build the 2.4 meter Hiltner Telescope. Whilst at Michigan, he received an Alfred P. Sloan Fellowship and won the Henry Russel Award.

In 1985, he moved to the Harvard Astronomy Department as Professor of Astronomy (1985–2016), where he served as Chairman of the Department from 1990–1997 and as the head of the Optical and Infrared Division of the Center for Astrophysics | Harvard & Smithsonian. from 1997–2003. He was appointed Clowes Professor of Science in 2001, Master of Quincy House, one of Harvard’s undergraduate residences, from 2001–2007 and Harvard College Professor (2004–2009). He helped Harvard join the Magellan Observatory in Chile and the Giant Magellan Telescope project.

In July, 2015 he was appointed Chief Program Officer for Science at the Gordon and Betty Moore Foundation, where he is leading the team responsible for distributing more than $100 million per year for research and technology that enables fundamental scientific discoveries. At the Gordon and Betty Moore Foundation, Kirshner is an observer on the Thirty Meter International Observatory board of directors.

== Achievements ==
In 1981, along with Augustus Oemler, Jr., Paul Schechter, and Stephen Shectman, Kirshner discovered the Boötes Void in a survey of galaxy redshifts. He led work on SN 1987A, the brightest supernova since Kepler's in 1604, using the International Ultraviolet Explorer satellite in 1987 and the Hubble Space Telescope after its launch in 1990. In the 1990s, together with Oemler, Schechter, Shectman and others he participated in the Las Campanas Redshift Survey, a pioneering 35,000 galaxy survey using fiber optics and plug plates. Kirshner is a co-author of 392 refereed articles in major astronomical journals that deal principally with supernova explosions and the application of supernovae to cosmology. His work has been cited over 57,000 times, and his h-index is 108.

Kirshner was a member of the High-Z Supernova Search Team that used observations of distant supernovae to discover the accelerating universe. This universal acceleration implies the existence of dark energy and was named the breakthrough of 1998 by Science magazine. For this work, he also shared in the 2007 Gruber Cosmology Prize. Brian Schmidt and Adam Riess, both of whom were among Kirshner's nineteen Ph.D. students, shared in the 2011 Nobel Prize in Physics for the same discovery. His account of this discovery is described in The Extravagant Universe : Exploding Stars, Dark Energy, and the Accelerating Cosmos (2002; ISBN 978-0-691-05862-7) which has been translated into Japanese, Chinese, Spanish, Portuguese and Czech. He has been a member of the National Academy of Sciences since 1998, the American Academy of Arts and Sciences since 1992 and the American Philosophical Society since 2005. He was the President of the American Astronomical Society from 2004–2006.

== Recognition ==
In 2004, he received the Caltech Distinguished Alumni Award. In 2010, he received an honorary Doctor of Science from the University of Chicago. In 2011, he won the Dannie Heineman Prize for Astrophysics from the American Institute of Physics. In 2012, he won a Guggenheim Fellowship. In 2014, he won the James Craig Watson Medal for service to astronomy from the National Academy of Sciences and shared in the Breakthrough Prize in Fundamental Physics with the High-Z Team. In 2015, he shared the Wolf Prize in Physics with B.J. Bjorken. In 2019, he received an honorary Doctor of Science from Ohio University. He is a popular writer and speaker both in the United States and internationally, and is represented by Jodi Soloman Speakers. He has been frequently interviewed by both mainstream journalists and the science press and is often quoted in the New York Times, the Washington Post, Nature, and Science magazine. He has written for the general public in National Geographic, Sky & Telescope, Natural History, and Scientific American.

Kirshner's service to science includes board memberships for the Gemini International Telescope, the AUI Board for the National Radio Astronomy Observatory, the Associated Universities for Research in Astronomy, the National Research Council Committee on Astronomy and Astrophysics, the NASA Advisory Committee Science Subcommittee, and the Math and Physical Sciences Advisory Committee for the National Science Foundation. Kirshner was a panelist for the 2000 and 2010 Decadal Reviews of Astronomy. He is a Fellow of the American Physical Society; a Fellow of the American Association for the Advancement of Science; and an Inaugural Fellow of the American Astronomical Society.

== Awards ==
- 2007: Gruber Prize in Cosmology (co-recipient with High-Z Supernova Search Team)
- 2011: Dannie Heineman Prize for Astrophysics from the American Institute of Physics
- 2014: James Craig Watson Medal
- 2015: Breakthrough Prize in Fundamental Physics, as member of the High-Z Supernova Search Team, shared with Brian P. Schmidt and Adam Riess.
- 2015: Wolf Prize in Physics
- 2020: Elected a Legacy Fellow of the American Astronomical Society in 2020.

== Personal life ==
In 1999, Kirshner married the novelist and filmmaker Jayne Loader. From 2001–2007, they were the Masters of Quincy House, one of Harvard's 12 undergraduate houses.

He is the father of the television writer/producer, Rebecca Rand Kirshner, and Matthew Kirshner, the CFO/GM of Format Entertainment in Los Angeles.

== See also ==
- J. Ward Moody
