= Mark M. Phillips =

American astronomer (born 1951)

- Mark M. Phillips
- Born: March 31, 1951 (age 75); San Diego
- Education: San Diego State University, University of California, Santa Cruz
- Awards: Gruber Prize in cosmology, 2007; Breakthrough of the Year 1998; AURA Science Award 1997; Breakthrough Prize in Fundamental Physics, 2015
- Scientific career
- Fields: Astronomy
- Doctoral advisor: Donald Osterbrock

Mark M. Phillips (born March 31, 1951) is an American astronomer who works on the observational studies of all classes of supernovae. He has worked on SN 1986G, SN 1987A, the Calán/Tololo Supernova Survey, the High-Z Supernova Search Team, and the Phillips relationship. This relationship has allowed the use of Type Ia supernovae as standard candles, leading to the precise measurements of the Hubble constant H_{0} and the deceleration parameter q_{0}, the latter implying the existence of dark energy or a cosmological constant in the Universe.

He is the past director of Cerro Tololo Inter-American Observatory of the National Optical Astronomy Observatory and is the Associate Director and Carnegie Staff Member at Las Campanas Observatory in Chile, part of the Observatories of the Carnegie Institution for Science.

He received his undergraduate degree in Astronomy from San Diego State University in 1973, and his Ph.D., also in Astronomy & Astrophysics in 1977, from the University of California, Santa Cruz and Lick Observatory where he was a student of Professor Donald Osterbrock. After graduate school, he was a postdoc at CTIO, then at Anglo-Australian Observatory, moving back to Chile in 1982 to become a staff astronomer at CTIO.

In addition to his work on supernovae, he has also worked extensively on the spectroscopic studies of Active Galactic Nuclei. A relation, discovered by Phillips, Jack Baldwin, and Roberto Terlevich, allows for the separation of types of Active Galactic Nuclei and is known as the "Baldwin-Phillips-Terlevich" or BPT relation.

In 2023, the University of California Santa Cruz honored Dr. Phillips as one of two recipients of the Alumni Achievement Award. He was recognized for "...his pioneering supernova research that led to the reversal of a major scientific theory on the trajectory of the universe and for the indelible legacy he has left for aspiring astronomers."

In 2024, Phillips was elected as a Fellow of the American Astronomical Society. In announcing the award, the AAS cited his achievements as: "For pioneering work in supernova physics and establishing Type Ia supernovae as standard candles, which enabled the accurate measurement of the Hubble-Lemaître constant and the discovery of the universe's accelerated expansion and dark energy; for improving the classification of active galaxies; and for years of service to the astronomical community."

In 2025, he was elected as a Honorary Member of the Chilean National Academy of Sciences. As stated in the citation (tranlated to English) "He is internationally recognized for his contributions to the study of supernovae and the accelerated expansion of the universe; he is Director Emeritus of the Las Campanas Observatory."

In 2026, he was awarded the San Diego State University Alumni Award of Distinction as a "globally renowned astronomer known for establishing the “Phillips Relation,” a crucial method that enables Type Ia supernovae to serve as standard candles for determining cosmic distances, which fundamentally shaped measurements of the universe's expansion..."
