= Charles Munnerlyn =

American optical engineer (born 1940)

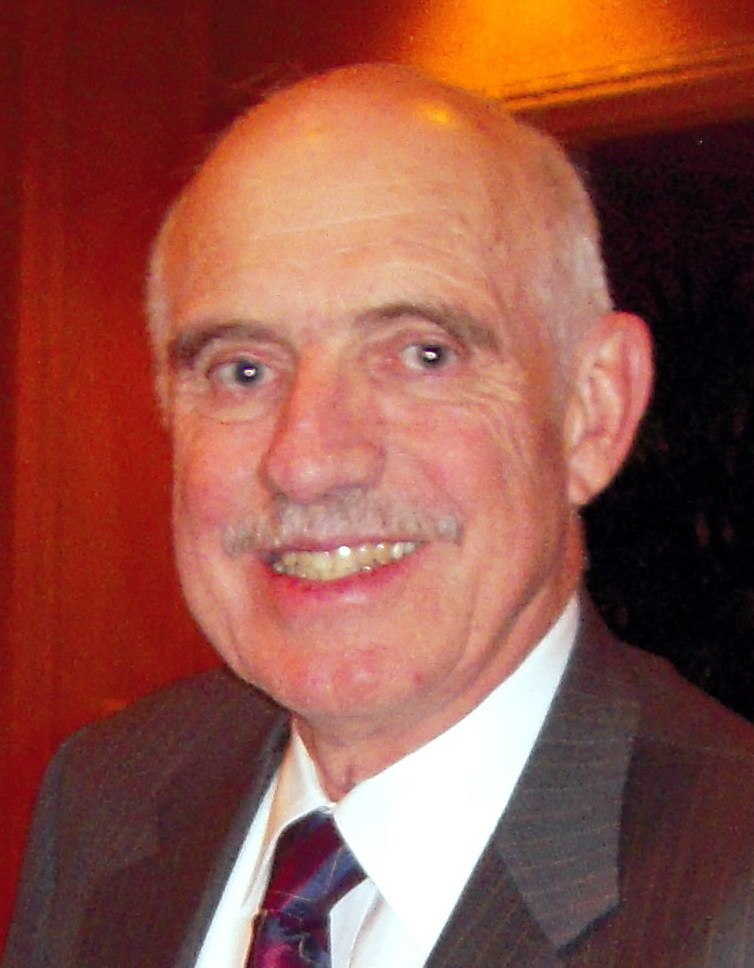
- Charles Munnerlyn, 2009
- Born: 1940 (age 85–86)
- Citizenship: United States
- Education: Texas A&M University, University of Rochester
- Scientific career
- Fields: Medical physics and medical optics

Charles Munnerlyn (born 1940 in Shreveport, LA) is an American optical engineer. He constructed the first working excimer laser system for vision correction in 1985, and also developed the Munnerlyn Formula that dictates the amount of corneal tissue to be removed by the laser to correct vision disorders such as myopia and astigmatism. Munnerlyn is the founder of VISX, Incorporated, once the world's largest manufacturer of laser-based vision correction (LVC) systems. VISX is now owned by Johnson & Johnson.

== Biography ==
Charles Ray Munnerlyn received his bachelor's degree in physics from Texas A&M University in 1962 and a doctorate in optical engineering from the University of Rochester in 1969.

=== Career ===
Following a stint in the U.S. Air Force, Munnerlyn continued his studies at the Institute of Optics at the University of Rochester, receiving his Ph.D. in optical engineering in 1969. He remained in the Rochester area as head of research and development for Tropel, a company that designed prototype custom lenses for applications that included Xerox copiers, Polaroid cameras, satellites and semiconductor photolithography. In the early 1970s, he designed the first automatic digital device to measure refractive errors in the eye. He also developed a pressure test to detect glaucoma before pioneering his laser systems for vision correction. Munnerlyn holds more than 30 U.S. patents in the field of optics.

Munnerlyn calculated the basic formula, now known as the "Munnerlyn Formula", that told ophthalmologists how much corneal tissue to remove in the actual laser vision correction procedure. With collaborator Terry Clapham, an electrical engineer, they left Coherent in 1983 to continue developing a YAG laser design for vision correction. They secured financial backing from a company called CooperVision, which wanted the rights to sell the system when it was successfully developed. In 1987, Munnerlyn and Clapham purchased the excimer laser technology from CooperVision and started their own company, VISX, Incorporated. They took VISX public in 1989, raising $4 million, then merged with competitor Taunton Technologies in 1990. By 2002, about two thirds of laser vision correction procedures in the U.S. were performed with VISX equipment. In December 2004, Advanced Medical Optics announced plans to purchased VISX for $1.27 billion. Munnerlyn retired in 2005.

He is an avid amateur astronomer, a member of the Board of Trustees for the University of Rochester, and on the Advisory Board of the Foundation of the American Academy of Ophthalmology. The Charles R. '62 & Judith G. Munnerlyn Astronomical Laboratory and Space Sciences Engineering Building at Texas A&M University, dedicated in September 2009 is named in their honor. He has also endowed a number of professorships at Texas A&M University including the Mitchell/Heep/Munnerlyn Endowed Chair in Observational Astronomy, and Munnerlyn-Heep Endowed Chair in Quantum Optics.

=== Marriage and children ===
He is married to Judith G. Munnerlyn.

== Awards ==
- 2001: Engineer of the Year, Design News
- 2001: Stevens Honor Award, Stevens Institute of Technology
- 2002: Distinguished Alumnus Award, School of Engineering and Applied Sciences at Rochester.
- 2007: Edwin H. Land Medal
- 2008: Rochester Distinguished Scholar Award
- 2008: Elected Fellow of The Optical Society
- 2009: Texas A&M University Distinguished Alumnus
