= Expanding photosphere method =

Method used to measure distances to Type II supernovae

The expanding photosphere method (EPM) is a method used to measure distances to Type II supernovae. It was developed by Robert Kirshner and John Kwan in 1974, based on the Baade–Wesselink method (1926). EPM is a geometrical method that compares a supernova's angular size to its physical size determined from spectroscopic measurements.

The method works by comparing a supernova photosphere's angular radius θ to its linear radius R to calculate its distance d through direct geometric calculation. This calculation requires determining two key parameters: the temperature of the ejecta's photosphere and its expansion velocity. The temperature is typically found by fitting a blackbody curve to the continuum spectrum. The photosphere's expansion velocity is calculated from the Doppler blueshift of specific absorption lines that form at the photosphere. Isolated, easily identified spectral lines should be used for calculations, because blended or misidentified lines can introduce significant uncertainties into the velocity measurement. Because the method relies on intrinsic luminosity of supernova, it is independent from the cosmic distance ladder, and doesn't require external calibration. The method is "observationally demanding" and requires a good quality spectra.

The method requires correcting for atmospheric dilution effects using theoretically calculated dilution factors. These account for electron scattering in the supernova's atmosphere causing it to deviate from a perfect blackbody. Different sets of dilution factors have been published, notably by Eastman et al. (1996) and Dessart & Hillier (2005).

EPM relies on several assumptions regarding supernovae photospheres:

1. the expansion of the ejected material is spherically symmetric
2. the ejecta is expanding homologously
3. the ejecta is optically thick
4. the photosphere radiates as a blackbody

Modified EPM was used to measure the Hubble constant.
