= Adam Riess =

American astrophysicist (born 1969)

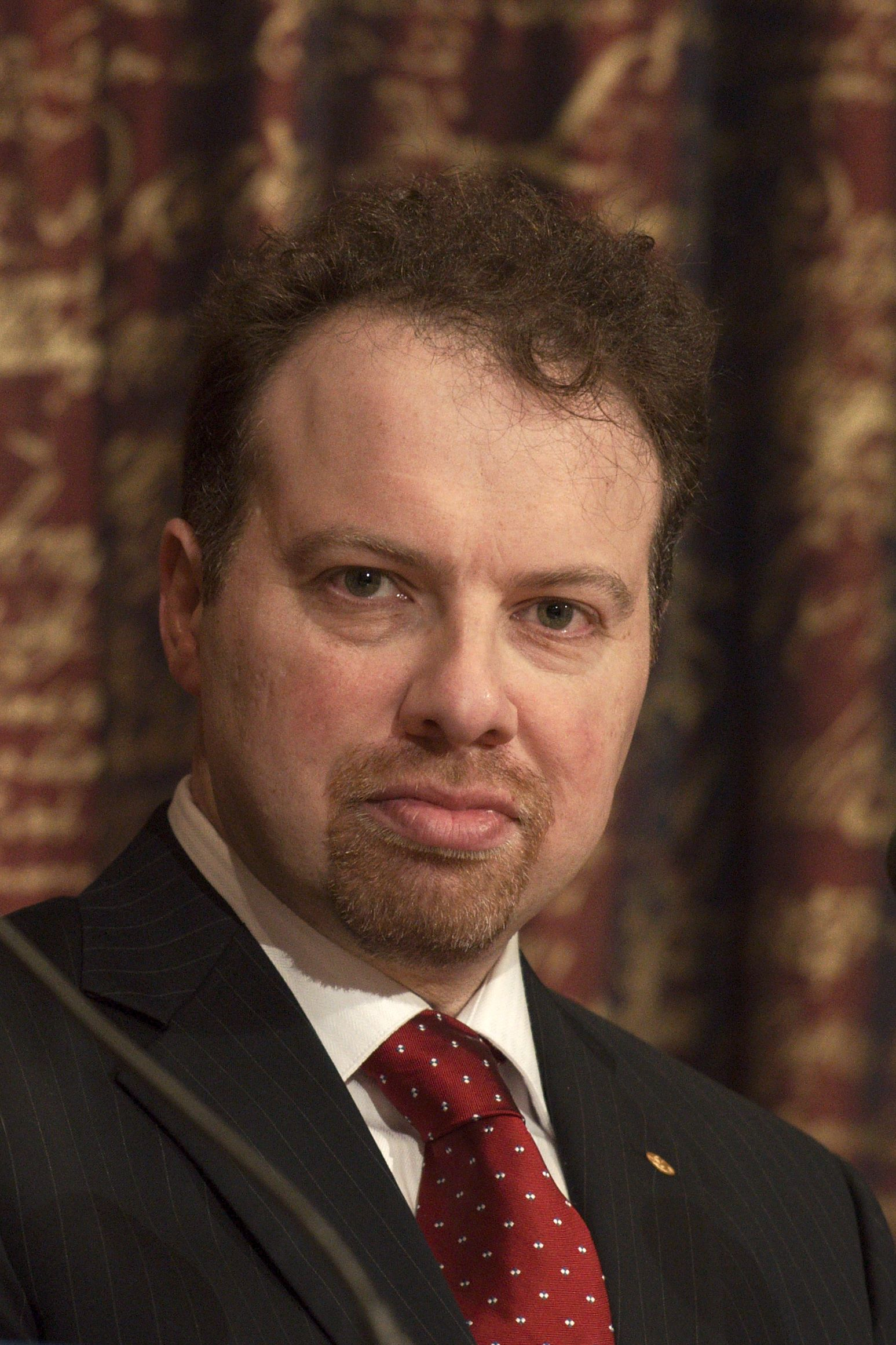
- Riess in 2011
- Born: Adam Guy Riess; December 16, 1969 (age 56); Washington, D.C., U.S.
- Education: Massachusetts Institute of Technology (BS); Harvard University (PhD)
- Known for: Accelerating universe / dark energy, Hubble constant
- Spouse: Nancy Joy Schondorf (m. 1998)
- Awards: Robert J. Trumpler Award (1999); Helen B. Warner Prize for Astronomy (2002); Sackler Prize for Physics (2004); Shaw Prize in Astronomy (2006); Nobel Prize in Physics (2011); Albert Einstein Medal (2011); Breakthrough Prize in Fundamental Physics (2015)
- Scientific career
- Fields: Physics
- Workplaces: University of California, Berkeley; Johns Hopkins University / Space Telescope Science Institute
- Thesis: Type Ia Supernova Multicolor Light Curve Shapes (1996)
- Doctoral advisor: Robert Kirshner, William H. Press
- Doctoral students: Daniel Scolnic

Adam Guy Riess (born December 16, 1969) is an American astrophysicist and Bloomberg Distinguished Professor at Johns Hopkins University and the Space Telescope Science Institute. He is known for his research in using supernovae as cosmological probes. Riess shared both the 2006 Shaw Prize in Astronomy and the 2011 Nobel Prize in Physics with Saul Perlmutter and Brian Schmidt for providing evidence that the expansion of the universe is accelerating.

Riess has been at the center of a growing scientific debate about the so-called “Hubble tension” — a discrepancy between measurements of the universe’s expansion rate using nearby supernovae, and measurements inferred from the cosmic microwave background radiation using the Standard Model of cosmology. Riess’s data has prompted questions and further testing to determine if the Standard Model still adequately describes the universe.

== Family ==
Riess was born to a Jewish family in Washington, D.C., and grew up in Warren Township, New Jersey. He has two sisters: Gail Saltz, a psychiatrist, and Holly Hagerman, an artist.

His father, Michael Riess (1931–2007), served in the U.S. Navy and later owned a frozen-foods distribution company; his mother, Doris Riess, worked as a clinical psychologist. His paternal grandfather was the journalist and war correspondent Curt Martin Riess.

Riess married Nancy Joy Schondorf in 1998. They have two children, Noah and Gabrielle.

== Education ==
He attended Watchung Hills Regional High School, graduating in the class of 1988. He also attended the prestigious New Jersey Governor's School in the Sciences in 1987. Riess then graduated Phi Beta Kappa from The Massachusetts Institute of Technology in 1992 where he was a member of the Phi Delta Theta fraternity. He received his PhD from Harvard University in 1996; it resulted in measurements of over twenty new Type Ia supernovae and a method to utilize Type Ia supernovae as accurate distance indicators by correcting for intervening dust and intrinsic inhomogeneities. Riess's PhD thesis was supervised by Robert Kirshner and William H. Press and won the Robert J. Trumpler Award in 1999 for PhD theses of unusual importance to astronomy.

== Research ==
Riess was a Miller Fellow at the University of California, Berkeley, from 1996 through 1999, during which period his first seminal paper on the discovery of an accelerating universe was published. In 1999, he moved to the Space Telescope Science Institute and took up a position at Johns Hopkins University in 2006. He also sits on the selection committee for the Astronomy award given under the auspices of the Shaw Prize. In July 2016, Riess was named a Bloomberg Distinguished Professor at Johns Hopkins University for his accomplishments as an interdisciplinary researcher and excellence in teaching the next generation of scholars. The Bloomberg Distinguished Professorships were established in 2013 by a gift from Michael Bloomberg.

Riess jointly led the study with Brian Schmidt in 1998 for the High-z Supernova Search Team which first reported evidence that the universe's expansion rate is accelerating through monitoring of Type Ia supernovae. The team's observations were contrary to the existing theory that the expansion of the universe was slowing down; instead, by monitoring the color shifts in the light from supernovae from Earth, they discovered that these billion-year old novae were still accelerating. This result was also found nearly simultaneously by the Supernova Cosmology Project, led by Saul Perlmutter. The corroborating evidence between the two competing studies led to the acceptance of the accelerating universe theory, and initiated new research to understand the nature of the universe, such as the existence of dark energy. The discovery of the accelerating universe was named 'Breakthrough of the Year' by Science magazine in 1998, and Riess was jointly awarded the 2011 Nobel Prize in Physics along with Schmidt and Perlmutter for their groundbreaking work.

From 2002 to 2007 Riess led the Higher-Z SN Team which used the Hubble Space Telescope to find dozens of type Ia supernovae at z>1, first demonstrating that the expansion of the Universe was decelerating before it began accelerating and ruling out astrophysical contamination of SN Ia.

Riess is also known for his efforts to measure the local value of the Hubble constant while leading the SH0ES Team since 2005 with measurements that approach 1% precision and which indicate a discrepancy with the model-based prediction from the CMB, a problem widely known in cosmology as the Hubble tension.

== Awards and honors ==
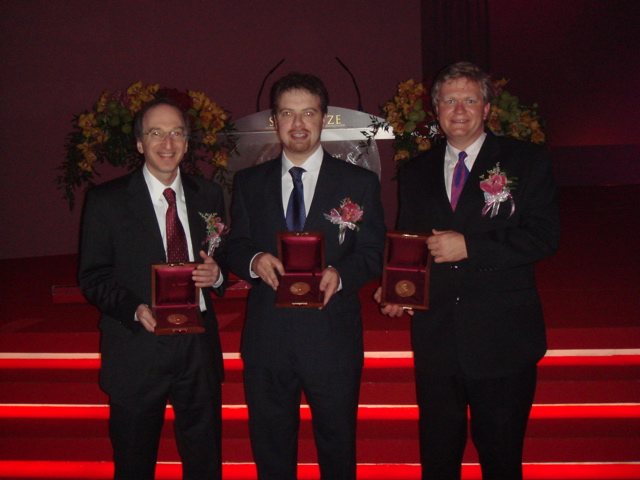
Saul Perlmutter, Riess, and Brian P. Schmidt being awarded the 2006 Shaw Prize in Astronomy. The trio would later be awarded the 2011 Nobel Prize in Physics.

Riess received the Astronomical Society of the Pacific's Robert J. Trumpler Award in 1999 and Harvard University's Bok Prize in 2001. He won the American Astronomical Society's Helen B. Warner Prize in 2003 and the Raymond and Beverly Sackler Prize in Physics in 2004 for the discovery of cosmic acceleration.

In 2006, he shared the $1 million Shaw Prize in Astronomy with Saul Perlmutter and Brian P. Schmidt for contributions to the discovery of the acceleration of the universe.

Schmidt and all the members of the High-Z Team (as defined by the co-authors of Riess et al. 1998) shared the 2007 Gruber Cosmology Prize, a $500,000 award, with the Supernova Cosmology Project (the set defined by the co-authors of Perlmutter et al. 1999) for their discovery of the accelerating expansion of the universe. Riess was the winner of MacArthur "Genius" Grant in 2008. He was also elected in 2009 to the National Academy of Sciences.

Along with Perlmutter and Schmidt, he was awarded the 2011 Nobel Prize in Physics for his contributions to the discovery of the acceleration of the expansion of the universe.

Riess, along with Brian P. Schmidt, and the High-Z Supernova Search Team shared in the 2015 Breakthrough Prize in Fundamental Physics.

In 2012, Riess received the Golden Plate Award of the American Academy of Achievement.

In 2020, Riess was made fellow of the American Astronomical Society.

== Media appearances ==
Riess participated on the NPR radio quiz program Wait Wait... Don't Tell Me! in 2011.

== Publications ==
Riess has more than 137,000 citations in Google Scholar and an h-index of 130. His most cited work, "Observational evidence from supernovae for an accelerating universe and a cosmological constant," has been cited over 28,000 times. Riess has been among the top 1% most cited in the world for subject field and year of publication in the Thomson Reuters Highly Cited Researchers reports for multiple years, including 2014-2016 and 2020-2023.

- Google Scholar citations

=== Highly cited articles (more than 2000 citations) ===
- 1998 with V Filippenko, P Challis, A Clocchiatti, A Diercks, et al., Observational evidence from supernovae for an accelerating universe and a cosmological constant, in: The Astronomical Journal. Vol. 116, nº 3; 1009.
- 2009 with KN Abazajian, JK Adelman-McCarthy, MA Agüeros, SS Allam, CA Prieto, et al., The seventh data release of the Sloan Digital Sky Survey, in: The Astrophysical Journal Supplement Series. Vol. 182, nº 2; 543.
- 2004 with LG Strolger, J Tonry, S Casertano, HC Ferguson, B Mobasher, et al., Type Ia supernova discoveries at z> 1 from the Hubble Space Telescope: Evidence for past deceleration and constraints on dark energy evolution, in: The Astrophysical Journal. Vol. 607, nº 2; 665.
- 2009 with KN Abazajian, JK Adelman-McCarthy, MA Agüeros, SS Allam, CA Prieto, et al., The seventh data release of the Sloan Digital Sky Survey, in: The Astrophysical Journal Supplement Series. Vol. 182, nº 2; 543.
- 2003 with JL Tonry, BP Schmidt, B Barris, P Candia, P Challis, A Clocchiatti, AL Coil, et al., Cosmological results from high-z supernovae, in: The Astrophysical Journal. Vol. 594, nº 1; 1.
- 2007 with LG Strolger, S Casertano, HC Ferguson, B Mobasher, B Gold, et al., New Hubble space telescope discoveries of type Ia supernovae at z≥ 1: narrowing constraints on the early behavior of dark energy, in: The Astrophysical Journal. Vol. 659, nº 1; 98.
- 1998 with BP Schmidt, NB Suntzeff, MM Phillips, RA Schommer, A Clocchiatti, et al., The high-Z supernova search: measuring cosmic deceleration and global curvature of the universe using type Ia supernovae, in: The Astrophysical Journal. Vol. 507, nº 1; 46.

== See also ==
- Cosmological constant
- Dark energy
- List of Jewish Nobel laureates

Awards and achievements
Preceded by Konstantin Novoselov and Andre Geim	Winner of the Nobel Prize in Physics with Saul Perlmutter and Brian Schmidt; 2011	Succeeded by Serge Haroche and David J. Wineland
