= Deceleration parameter =

Dimensionless measure in cosmology

The deceleration parameter $q$ in cosmology is a dimensionless measure of the cosmic acceleration of the expansion of space in a Friedmann–Lemaître–Robertson–Walker universe. It is defined by:
$$q \ \stackrel{\mathrm{def}}{=}\  -\frac{\ddot{a} a }{\dot{a}^2}$$
where $a$ is the scale factor of the universe and the dots indicate derivatives by proper time. The expansion of the universe is said to be "accelerating" if $\ddot{a} > 0$ (recent measurements suggest it is), and in this case the deceleration parameter will be negative. The minus sign and name "deceleration parameter" are historical; at the time of definition $\ddot{a}$ was expected to be negative, so a minus sign was inserted in the definition to make $q$ positive in that case. Since the evidence for the accelerating universe in the 1998–2003 era, it is now believed that $\ddot{a}$ is positive therefore the present-day value $q_0$ is negative (though $q$ was positive in the past before dark energy became dominant). In general $q$ varies with cosmic time, except in a few special cosmological models; the present-day value is denoted $q_0$.

The Friedmann acceleration equation can be written as
$$\frac{\ddot{a}}{a} =-\frac{4 \pi G}{3} \sum_i (\rho_i +\frac{3\,p_i}{c^2})= -\frac{4\pi G}{3} \sum_i \rho_i (1 + 3 w_i),$$
where the sum $i$ extends over the different components, matter, radiation and dark energy, $\rho_i$ is the equivalent mass density of each component, $p_i$ is its pressure, and $w_i = p_i/(\rho_i c^2)$ is the equation of state for each component. The value of $w_i$ is 0 for non-relativistic matter (baryons and dark matter), 1/3 for radiation, and −1 for a cosmological constant; for more general dark energy it may differ from −1, in which case it is denoted $w_{DE}$ or simply $w$.

Defining the critical density as
$$\rho_{c} = \frac{3 H^2}{8 \pi G}$$
and the density parameters $\Omega_i \equiv \rho_i / \rho_c$, substituting $\rho_i = \Omega_i\,\rho_c$ in the acceleration equation gives
$$q= \frac{1}{2} \sum \Omega_i (1+3w_i) = \Omega_\text{rad}(z) +\frac{1}{2}\Omega_m(z) + \frac{1+3w_\text{DE} }{2} \Omega_\text{DE}(z) \ .$$
where the density parameters are at the relevant cosmic epoch. At the present day $\Omega_\text{rad} \sim 10^{-4}$ is negligible, and if $w_{DE} = -1$ (cosmological constant) this simplifies to
$$q_0 = \frac{1}{2} \Omega_m - \Omega_\Lambda .$$
where the density parameters are present-day values; with Ω_{Λ} + Ω_{m} ≈ 1, and Ω_{Λ} = 0.7 and then Ω_{m} = 0.3, this evaluates to $q_0 \approx -0.55$ for the parameters estimated from the Planck spacecraft data. (Note that the CMB, as a high-redshift measurement, does not directly measure $q_0$; but its value can be inferred by fitting cosmological models to the CMB data, then calculating $q_0$ from the other measured parameters as above).

The time derivative of the Hubble parameter can be written in terms of the deceleration parameter:
$$\frac{\dot{H}}{H^2}=-(1+q).$$

Except in the speculative case of phantom energy (which violates all the energy conditions), all postulated forms of mass-energy yield a deceleration parameter $q \geqslant -1.$ Thus, any non-phantom universe should have a decreasing Hubble parameter, except in the case of the distant future of a Lambda-CDM model, where $q$ will tend to −1 from above and the Hubble parameter will asymptote to a constant value of $H_0 \sqrt{\Omega_\Lambda}$.

The above results imply that the universe would be decelerating for any cosmic fluid with equation of state $w$ greater than $-\tfrac{1}{3}$ (any fluid satisfying the strong energy condition does so, as does any form of matter present in the Standard Model, but excluding inflation). However observations of distant type Ia supernovae indicate that $q$ is negative; the expansion of the universe is accelerating. This is an indication that the gravitational attraction of matter, on the cosmological scale, is more than counteracted by the negative pressure of dark energy, in the form of either quintessence or a positive cosmological constant.

Before the first indications of an accelerating universe, in 1998, it was thought that the universe was dominated by matter with negligible pressure, $w \approx 0.$ This implied that the deceleration parameter would be equal to $\Omega_m/2$, e.g. $q_0 = 1/2$ for a universe with $\Omega_m = 1$ or $q_0 \sim 0.1$ for a low-density zero-Lambda model. The experimental effort to discriminate these cases with supernovae actually revealed negative $q_0 \sim -0.6 \pm 0.2$, evidence for cosmic acceleration, which has subsequently grown stronger.
