= Type Ia supernova =

Type of supernova in binary systems

At the core of a planetary nebula, Henize 2-428, two white dwarf stars slightly under one solar mass each are expected to merge and create a Type Ia supernova destroying both in about 700 million years (artist's impression).

A Type Ia supernova (read: "type one-A") is a supernova that occurs in binary systems (two stars orbiting one another) in which one of the stars is a white dwarf. The other star can be anything from a giant star to an even smaller white dwarf.

Physically, carbon–oxygen white dwarfs with a low rate of rotation are limited to below 1.44 solar masses (M_{☉}). Beyond this "critical mass", they reignite and in some cases trigger a supernova explosion; this critical mass is often referred to as the Chandrasekhar mass, but is marginally different from the absolute Chandrasekhar limit, where electron degeneracy pressure is unable to prevent catastrophic collapse. If a white dwarf gradually accretes mass from a binary companion, or merges with a second white dwarf, the general hypothesis is that a white dwarf's core will reach the ignition temperature for carbon fusion as it approaches the Chandrasekhar mass. Within a few seconds of initiation of nuclear fusion, a substantial fraction of the matter in the white dwarf undergoes a runaway reaction, releasing enough energy (1×10^{44} J) to unbind the star in a supernova explosion.

The Type Ia category of supernova produces a fairly consistent peak luminosity because of the fixed critical mass at which a white dwarf will explode. Their consistent peak luminosity allows these explosions to be used as standard candles to measure the distance to their host galaxies: the visual magnitude of a Type Ia supernova, as observed from Earth, indicates its distance from Earth.

== Consensus model ==
Spectrum of SN 1998aq, a Type Ia supernova, one day after maximum light in the B band

The Type Ia supernova is a subcategory in the Minkowski–Zwicky supernova classification scheme, which was devised by German-American astronomer Rudolph Minkowski and Swiss astronomer Fritz Zwicky. There are several means by which a supernova of this type can form, but they share a common underlying mechanism. Theoretical astronomers long believed the progenitor star for this type of supernova is a white dwarf, and empirical evidence for this was found in 2014 when SN 2014J was observed in the galaxy Messier 82. When a slowly-rotating carbon–oxygen white dwarf accretes matter from a companion, it can exceed the Chandrasekhar limit of about 1.44 M_{☉}, beyond which electron degeneracy pressure will no longer support its mass against gravitational collapse. In the absence of a countervailing process, the white dwarf would collapse to form a neutron star, in an accretion-induced non-ejective process, as normally occurs in the case of a white dwarf that is primarily composed of magnesium, neon, and oxygen.

The current view among astronomers who model Type Ia supernova explosions, however, is that this limit is never actually attained and collapse is never initiated. Instead, the increase in pressure and density due to the increasing mass raises the temperature of the core, and as the white dwarf approaches about 99% of the limit, a period of convection ensues, lasting approximately 1,000 years. At some point in this simmering phase, a deflagration flame front is born, powered by carbon fusion. The details of the ignition are still unknown, including the location and number of points where the flame begins. Oxygen fusion is initiated shortly thereafter, but this fuel is not consumed as completely as carbon.

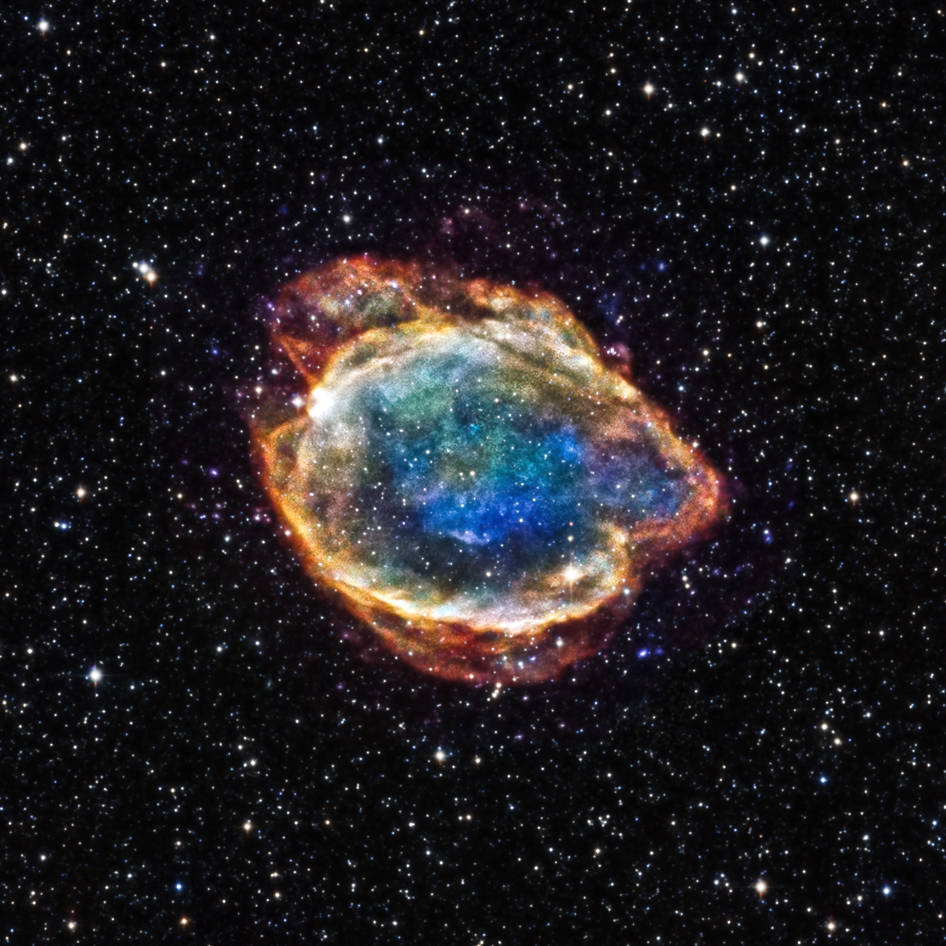
G299 Type Ia supernova remnant.

Once fusion begins, the temperature of the white dwarf increases. A main sequence star supported by thermal pressure can expand and cool which automatically regulates the increase in thermal energy. However, degeneracy pressure is independent of temperature; white dwarfs are unable to regulate temperature in the manner of normal stars, so they are vulnerable to runaway fusion reactions. The flare accelerates dramatically, in part due to the Rayleigh–Taylor instability and interactions with turbulence. It is still a matter of considerable debate whether this flare transforms into a supersonic detonation from a subsonic deflagration.

Regardless of the exact details of how the supernova ignites, it is generally accepted that a substantial fraction of the carbon and oxygen in the white dwarf fuses into heavier elements within a period of only a few seconds, with the accompanying release of energy increasing the internal temperature to billions of degrees. The energy released (1–2×10^{44} J) is more than sufficient to unbind the star; that is, the individual particles making up the white dwarf gain enough kinetic energy to fly apart from each other. The star explodes violently and releases a shock wave in which matter is typically ejected at speeds on the order of 5,000–20,000 km/s, roughly 6% of the speed of light. The energy released in the explosion also causes an extreme increase in luminosity. The typical visual absolute magnitude of Type Ia supernovae is M_{v} = −19.3 (about 5 billion times brighter than the Sun), with little variation. The Type Ia supernova leaves no compact remnant, but the whole mass of the former white dwarf dissipates through space.

The theory of this type of supernova is similar to that of novae, in which a white dwarf accretes matter more slowly and does not approach the Chandrasekhar limit. In the case of a nova, the infalling matter causes a hydrogen fusion surface explosion that does not disrupt the star.

Type Ia supernovae differ from Type II supernovae, which are caused by the cataclysmic explosion of the outer layers of a massive star as its core collapses, powered by release of gravitational potential energy via neutrino emission.

== Formation ==
Formation process

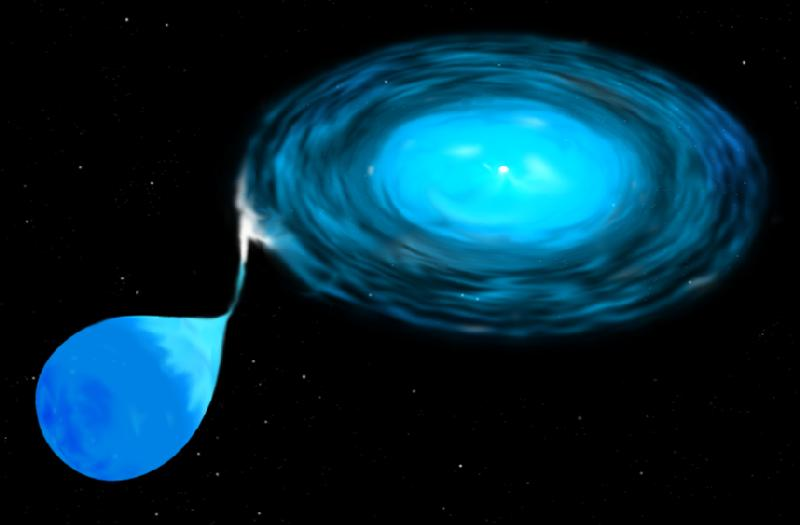
An accretion disc forms around a compact body (such as a white dwarf) stripping gas from a companion giant star. NASA image

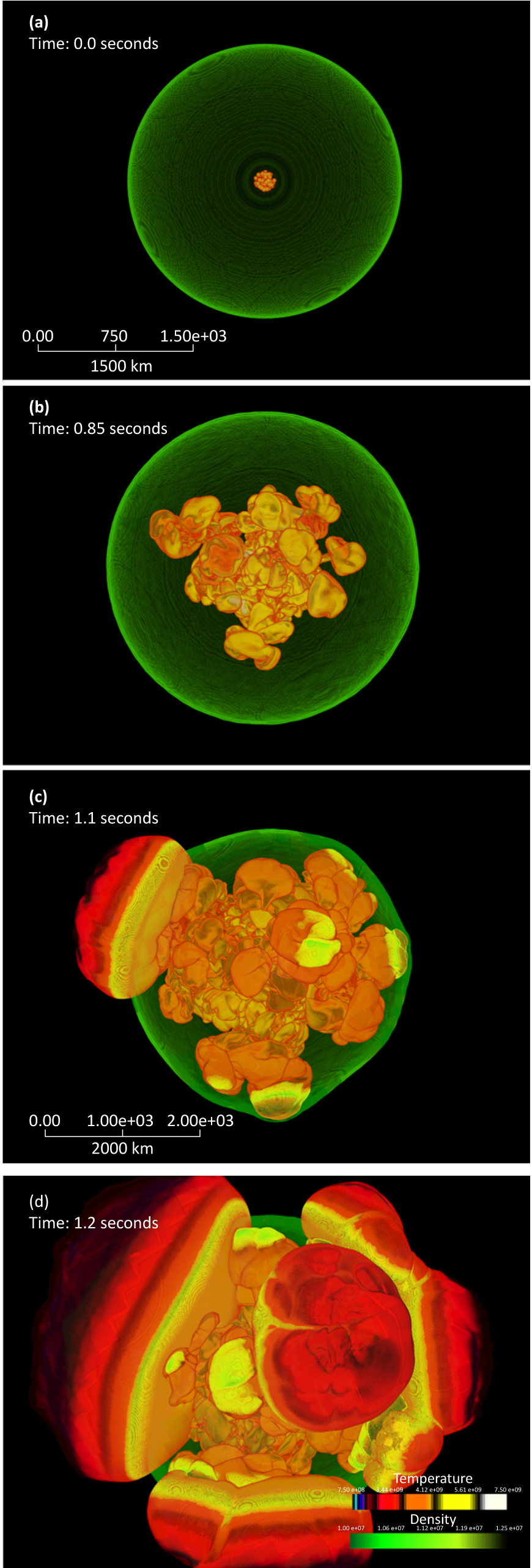
Supercomputer simulation of the explosion phase of the deflagration-to-detonation model of supernova formation.

=== Single degenerate progenitors ===
One model for the formation of this category of supernova is a close binary star system. The progenitor binary system consists of main sequence stars, with the primary possessing more mass than the secondary. Being greater in mass, the primary is the first of the pair to evolve onto the asymptotic giant branch, where the star's envelope expands considerably. If the two stars share a common envelope then the system can lose significant amounts of mass, reducing the angular momentum, orbital radius and period. After the primary has degenerated into a white dwarf, the secondary star later evolves into a red giant and the stage is set for mass accretion onto the primary. During this final shared-envelope phase, the two stars spiral in closer together as angular momentum is lost. The resulting orbit can have a period as brief as a few hours. If the accretion continues long enough, the white dwarf may eventually approach the Chandrasekhar limit.

The white dwarf companion could also accrete matter from other types of companions, including a subgiant or (if the orbit is sufficiently close) even a main sequence star. The actual evolutionary process during this accretion stage remains uncertain, as it can depend both on the rate of accretion and the transfer of angular momentum to the white dwarf companion.

It has been estimated that single degenerate progenitors account for no more than 20% of all Type Ia supernovae.

=== Double degenerate progenitors ===
A second possible mechanism for triggering a Type Ia supernova is the merger of two white dwarfs whose combined mass exceeds the Chandrasekhar limit. The resulting merger is called a super-Chandrasekhar mass white dwarf. In such a case, the total mass would not be constrained by the Chandrasekhar limit.

Collisions of solitary stars within the Milky Way occur only once every 10^{7} to 10^{13} years; far less frequently than the appearance of novae. Collisions occur with greater frequency in the dense core regions of globular clusters (cf. blue stragglers). A likely scenario is a collision with a binary star system, or between two binary systems containing white dwarfs. This collision can leave behind a close binary system of two white dwarfs. Their orbit decays and they merge through their shared envelope. A study based on SDSS spectra found 15 double systems of the 4,000 white dwarfs tested, implying a double white dwarf merger every 100 years in the Milky Way: this rate matches the number of Type Ia supernovae detected in our neighborhood.

A double degenerate scenario is one of several explanations proposed for the anomalously massive (2 M_{☉}) progenitor of SN 2003fg. It is the only possible explanation for SNR 0509-67.5, as all possible models with only one white dwarf have been ruled out. It has also been strongly suggested for SN 1006, given that no companion star remnant has been found there. Observations made with NASA's Swift space telescope ruled out existing supergiant or giant companion stars of every Type Ia supernova studied. The supergiant companion's blown out outer shell should emit X-rays, but this glow was not detected by Swift's XRT (X-ray telescope) in the 53 closest supernova remnants. For 12 Type Ia supernovae observed within 10 days of the explosion, the satellite's UVOT (ultraviolet/optical telescope) showed no ultraviolet radiation originating from the heated companion star's surface hit by the supernova shock wave, meaning there were no red giants or larger stars orbiting those supernova progenitors. In the case of SN 2011fe, the companion star must have been smaller than the Sun, if it existed. The Chandra X-ray Observatory revealed that the X-ray radiation of five elliptical galaxies and the bulge of the Andromeda Galaxy is 30–50 times fainter than expected. X-ray radiation should be emitted by the accretion discs of Type Ia supernova progenitors. The missing radiation indicates that few white dwarfs possess accretion discs, ruling out the common, accretion-based model of Ia supernovae. Inward spiraling white dwarf pairs are strongly-inferred candidate sources of gravitational waves, although they have not been directly observed.

=== Core degenerate progenitors ===
Another proposed channel is the core-degenerate scenario, in which a white dwarf merges with the hot core of an asymptotic giant branch star during the final stages of common-envelope evolution or shortly afterward. In this picture, part of the ejected envelope may remain bound and form a circumbinary disk, whose interaction with the compact binary can extract orbital angular momentum and help drive the merger. The merger remnant may form a massive, rapidly rotating white dwarf that can later explode as a Type Ia supernova.

=== Type Iax ===
It has been proposed that a group of sub-luminous supernovae should be classified as Type Iax. This type of supernova may not always completely destroy the white dwarf progenitor, but instead leave behind a zombie star. Known examples of Type Iax supernovae include: the historical supernova SN 1181, SN 1991bg, SN 2002cx, and SN 2012Z.

The supernova SN 1181 is believed to be associated with the supernova remnant Pa 30 and its central star IRAS 00500+6713, which is the result of a merger of a CO white dwarf and an ONe white dwarf. This makes Pa 30 and IRAS 00500+6713 the only SN Iax remnant in the Milky Way.

== Observation ==
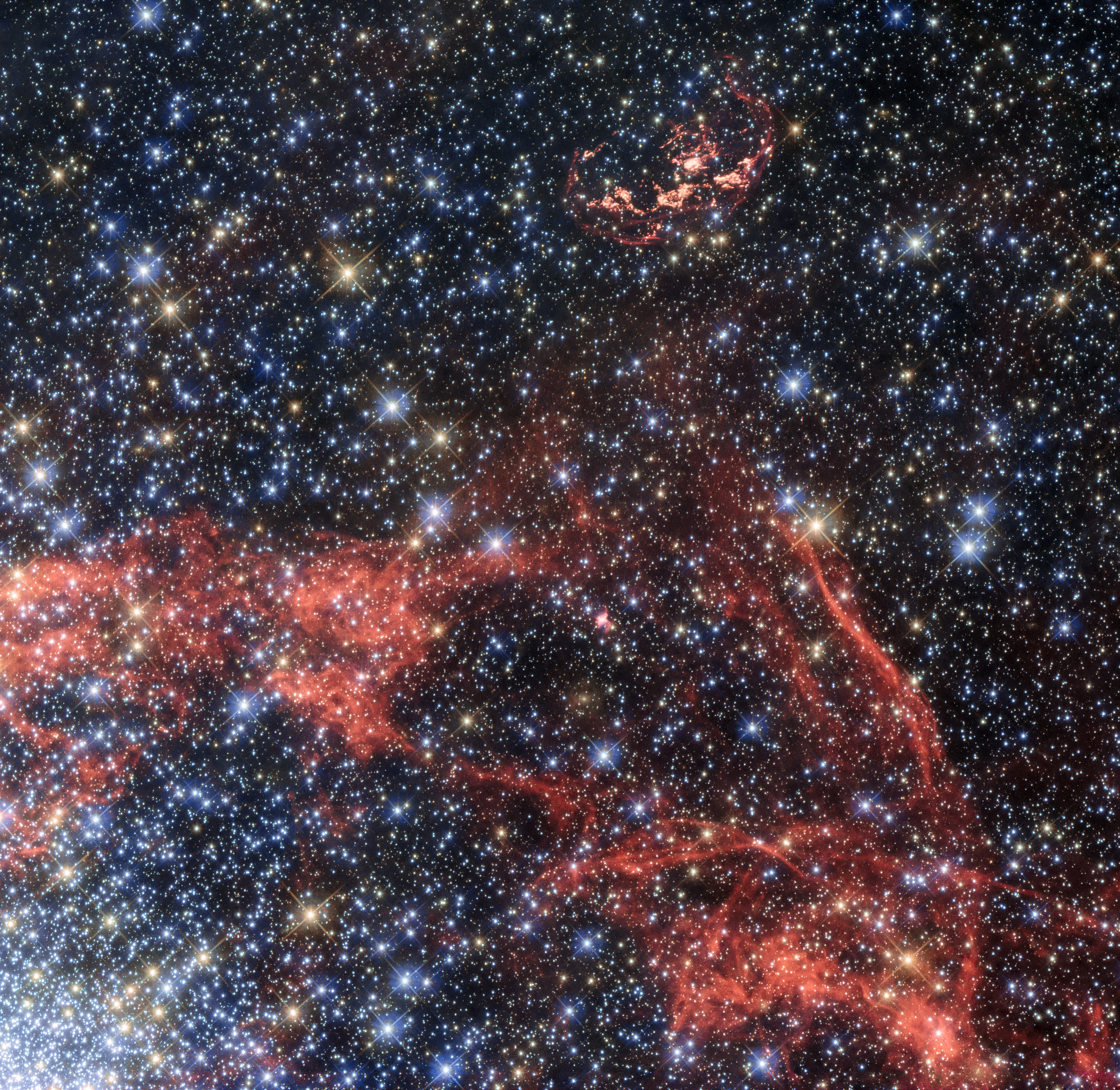
Supernova remnant N103B taken by the Hubble Space Telescope.

Unlike the other types of supernovae, Type Ia supernovae generally occur in all types of galaxies, including ellipticals. They show no preference for regions of current stellar formation. As white dwarf stars form at the end of a star's main sequence evolutionary period, such a long-lived star system may have wandered far from the region where it originally formed. Thereafter a close binary system may spend another million years in the mass transfer stage (possibly forming persistent nova outbursts) before the conditions are ripe for a Type Ia supernova to occur.

A long-standing problem in astronomy has been the identification of supernova progenitors. Direct observation of a progenitor would provide useful constraints on supernova models. As of 2006, the search for such a progenitor had been ongoing for longer than a century. Observation of the supernova SN 2011fe has provided useful constraints. Previous observations with the Hubble Space Telescope did not show a star at the position of the event, thereby excluding a red giant as the source. The expanding plasma from the explosion was found to contain carbon and oxygen, making it likely the progenitor was a white dwarf primarily composed of these elements. Similarly, observations of the nearby SN PTF 11kx, discovered January 16, 2011 (UT) by the Palomar Transient Factory (PTF), lead to the conclusion that this explosion arises from single-degenerate progenitor, with a red giant companion, thus suggesting there is no single progenitor path to SN Ia. Direct observations of the progenitor of PTF 11kx were reported in the August 24 edition of Science and support this conclusion, and also show that the progenitor star experienced periodic nova eruptions before the supernova – another surprising discovery. However, later analysis revealed that the circumstellar material is too massive for the single-degenerate scenario, and fits better the core-degenerate scenario.

In May 2015, NASA reported that the Kepler space observatory observed KSN 2011b, a Type Ia supernova in the process of exploding. Details of the pre-nova moments may help scientists better judge the quality of Type Ia supernovae as standard candles, which is an important link in the argument for dark energy.

In July 2019, the Hubble Space Telescope took three images of a Type Ia supernova through a gravitational lens. This supernova appeared at three different times in the evolution of its brightness due to the differing path length of the light in the three images; at −24, 92, and 107 days from peak luminosity. A fourth image will appear in 2037 allowing observation of the entire luminosity cycle of the supernova.

=== Light curve ===
This plot of luminosity (relative to the Sun, L_{0}) versus time shows the characteristic light curve for a Type Ia supernova. The peak is primarily due to the decay of nickel (Ni), while the later stage is powered by cobalt (Co).

Light curve for Type Ia, over the course of one year SN 2018gv

Type Ia supernovae have a characteristic light curve, their graph of luminosity as a function of time after the explosion. Near the time of maximal luminosity, the spectrum contains lines of intermediate-mass elements from oxygen to calcium; these are the main constituents of the outer layers of the star. Months after the explosion, when the outer layers have expanded to the point of transparency, the spectrum is dominated by light emitted by material near the core of the star, heavy elements synthesized during the explosion; most prominently isotopes close to the mass of iron (iron-peak elements). The radioactive decay of nickel-56 through cobalt-56 to iron-56 produces high-energy photons, which dominate the energy output of the ejecta at intermediate to late times.

The use of Type Ia supernovae to measure precise distances was pioneered by a collaboration of Chilean and US astronomers, the Calán/Tololo Supernova Survey. In a series of papers in the 1990s the survey showed that while Type Ia supernovae do not all reach the same peak luminosity, a single parameter measured from the light curve can be used to correct unreddened Type Ia supernovae to standard candle values. The original correction to standard candle value is known as the Phillips relationship and was shown by this group to be able to measure relative distances to 7% accuracy. The cause of this uniformity in peak brightness is related to the amount of nickel-56 produced in white dwarfs presumably exploding near the Chandrasekhar limit.

The similarity in the absolute luminosity profiles of nearly all known Type Ia supernovae has led to their use as a secondary standard candle in extragalactic astronomy. Improved calibrations of the Cepheid variable distance scale and direct geometric distance measurements to NGC 4258 from the dynamics of maser emission when combined with the Hubble diagram of the Type Ia supernova distances have led to an improved value of the Hubble constant.

In 1998, observations of distant Type Ia supernovae indicated the unexpected result that the universe seems to undergo an accelerating expansion. Three members from two teams were subsequently awarded Nobel Prizes for this discovery.

== Subtypes ==
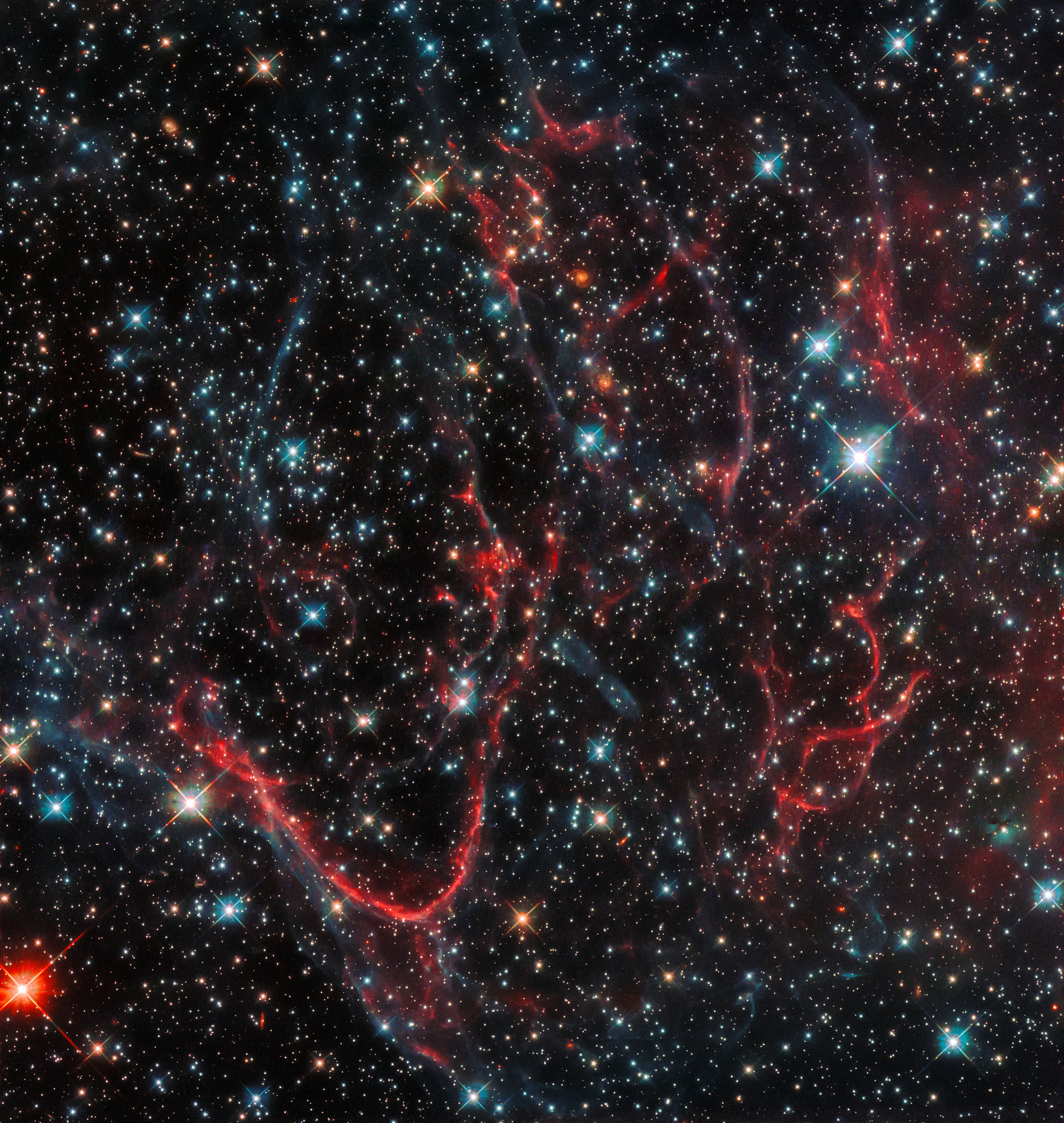
Supernova remnant SNR 0454-67.2 is likely the result of a Type Ia supernova explosion.

There is significant diversity within the class of Type Ia supernovae. Reflecting this, a plethora of sub-classes have been identified. Two prominent and well-studied examples include 1991T-likes, an overluminous $(M_V \lesssim-19.5)$ subclass that exhibits particularly strong iron absorption lines and abnormally small silicon features, and 1991bg-likes, an exceptionally dim $(M_V\gtrsim-18)$ subclass characterized by strong early titanium absorption features and rapid photometric and spectral evolution. Despite their abnormal luminosities, members of both peculiar groups can be standardized by use of the Phillips relation, defined at blue wavelengths, to determine distance.

== See also ==
- Carbon detonation – Runaway fusion in a white dwarf star
- Cosmic distance ladder – Succession of methods by which astronomers determine the distances to celestial objects
- History of supernova observation – Ancient and modern recorded observations of supernovae explosions
- List of supernova remnants
- Near-Earth supernova – Supernova close enough to affect Earth's biosphere
- Supernova remnant – Remnants of an exploded star
