= Intensity mapping =

In cosmology, intensity mapping is an observational technique for surveying the large-scale structure of the universe by using the integrated radio emission from unresolved gas clouds.

In its most common variant, 21 cm intensity mapping, the 21 cm emission line of neutral hydrogen is used to trace the gas. The hydrogen follows fluctuations in the underlying cosmic density field, with regions of higher density giving rise to a higher intensity of emission. Intensity fluctuations can therefore be used to reconstruct the power spectrum of matter fluctuations. The frequency of the emission line is redshifted by the expansion of the Universe, so by using radio receivers that cover a wide frequency band, one can detect this signal as a function of redshift, and thus cosmic time. This is similar in principle to a galaxy redshift survey, with the important distinction that galaxies need to be individually detected and measured, making intensity mapping a considerably faster method.

== History ==
- Aug 1977: Varshalovich and Khersonskii calculate the effect of 21cm line absorption at high redshift on the spectrum of the CMB.
- Aug 1996: Madau, Meiksin & Rees propose intensity mapping as a way of probing the Epoch of Reionization.
- Dec 2001: Bharadwaj & Sethi propose using intensity maps of neutral hydrogen to observe the matter distribution in the post-reionisation epoch.
- Jan 2004: Battye, Davies & Weller propose using 21 cm intensity maps to measure dark energy.
- Jun 2006: Peterson, Bandura, and Pen propose the Hubble Sphere Hydrogen Survey
- Mar 2009: Cosmological HI signal observed for the first time out to redshift 1.12 by the Green Bank Telescope.
- Jan 2013: Construction begins on the CHIME experiment in British Columbia, Canada.

== Scientific applications ==
Intensity mapping has been proposed as a way of measuring the cosmic matter density field in several different regimes.

=== Epoch of Reionization ===
Between the times of recombination and reionization, the baryonic content of the Universe – mostly hydrogen – existed in a neutral phase. Detecting the 21 cm emission from this time, all the way through to the end of reionization, has been proposed as a powerful way of studying early structure formation. This period of the Universe's history corresponds to redshifts of $z \approx 30$ to $z \approx 6 - 12$, implying a frequency range for intensity mapping experiments of 50 – 200 MHz.

=== Large-scale structure and dark energy ===
At late times, after the Universe has reionized, most of the remaining neutral hydrogen is stored in dense gas clouds called damped Lyman-alpha systems, where it is protected from ionizing UV radiation. These are predominantly hosted in galaxies, so the neutral hydrogen signal is effectively a tracer of the galaxy distribution.

As with galaxy redshift surveys, intensity mapping observations can be used to measure the geometry and expansion rate of the Universe (and therefore the properties of dark energy) by using the baryon acoustic oscillation feature in the matter power spectrum as a standard ruler. The growth rate of structure, useful for testing modifications to general relativity, can also be measured using redshift space distortions. Both of these features are found at large scales of tens to hundreds of megaparsecs, which is why low angular resolution (unresolved) maps of neutral hydrogen are sufficient to detect them. This should be compared with the resolution of a redshift survey, which must detect individual galaxies that are typically only tens of kiloparsecs across.

Because intensity mapping surveys can be carried out much faster than conventional optical redshift surveys, it is possible to map-out significantly larger volumes of the Universe. As such, intensity mapping has been proposed as a way of measuring phenomena on extremely large scales, including primordial non-Gaussianity from inflation and general relativistic corrections to the matter correlation function.

=== Molecular and fine structure lines ===
In principle, any emission line can be used to make intensity maps if it can be detected. Other emission lines that have been proposed as cosmological tracers include:

- Rotational transitions in molecules, such as carbon monoxide
- Fine structure transitions from species such as ionized carbon
- Lyman-alpha emission from hydrogen

== Experiments ==
The following telescopes have either hosted intensity mapping surveys, or plan to carry them out in future.

- TIANLAI (China)
- BINGO (Brazil/Uruguay/UK)
- CHIME (Canada)
- COMAP (USA)
- FAST (China)
- Green Bank Telescope (USA)
- HIRAX (South Africa)
- KAT7 (South Africa)
- MeerKAT (South Africa)
- Parkes radio telescope (Australia)
- PAPER (USA/South Africa/Australia)
- Square Kilometre Array (South Africa/Australia)

The Goddard Space Flight Center also host a list of intensity mapping experiments.
