= Hydrogen Intensity and Real-time Analysis eXperiment =

Interferometric radio array

- Alternative names: HIRAX
- Location: South Africa
- Coordinates: 30°43′16″S 21°24′40″E
- Wavelength: 37 cm (810 MHz)–75 cm (400 MHz)
- Collecting area: 28,000 m^{2} (300,000 sq ft)
- Website: hirax.ukzn.ac.za
- Location within South Africa

The Hydrogen Intensity and Real-time Analysis eXperiment (HIRAX) is an interferometric array of 1024 6-meter (20ft) diameter radio telescopes, operating at 400-800MHz, that will be deployed at the Square Kilometer Array site in the Karoo region of South Africa. The array is designed to measure red-shifted 21-cm hydrogen line emission on large angular scales, in order to map out the baryon acoustic oscillations, and constrain models of dark energy and dark matter.

The HIRAX collaboration is made up of over a dozen institutions, mainly from South Africa, the United States, and Canada, including the University of KwaZulu-Natal, the Durban University of Technology, the African Institute for Mathematical Sciences, the Botswana International University of Science and Technology, the University of the Western Cape, Rhodes University, the University of Cape Town, McGill University, the University of Toronto, the University of British Columbia, the Inter-University Centre for Astronomy and Astrophysics, Yale University, Caltech, Carnegie Mellon, the University of Wisconsin, the West Virginia University, Oxford University, the Astroparticle and Cosmology Laboratory, the Nelson Mandela University, EPFL, the ETH Zurich, and the NASA Jet Propulsion Laboratory. It is funded by the National Research Foundation of South Africa, and by the partner institutions.

The HIRAX array is named in reference to the hyrax, a local mammal, and in parallel to the neighboring meerKAT radio telescope and its eponymous animal.

== Science goals ==
The nature of dark energy and dark matter are among the greatest unsolved mysteries in modern cosmology. It has been known since the late 1920s, with the discovery of Hubble's law, that the universe is expanding, but for most of the 20th century it was assumed that this was a decelerating expansion, following a hot Big Bang. However, in the late 1990s it was discovered that the expansion of the universe is in fact accelerating. Dark energy is the hypothesized form of energy which causes this acceleration, however little is known about it beyond the fact that it must currently comprise approximately 70% of the energy density of the universe. Dark matter also plays a significant role in the growth of structures within the universe. It is believed to be a form of matter that interacts with the gravitational force, but not the electromagnetic force, and it is known to make up approximately 25% of the energy density of the universe, but the exact nature of it is not understood. The remaining 5% of the energy density of the universe is the baryonic matter which we can see; the stars, gas and dust that makes up galaxies and galaxy clusters.

HIRAX is designed to measure the effects of dark energy and dark matter on the dynamics of the universe over a long period of time (~4 billion years) to learn more about their nature. This is accomplished by looking at the 21-cm line emission produced by hot diffuse neutral hydrogen from distant galaxy clusters and from the intracluster medium. This neutral hydrogen traces out the large scale structures in the universe, and so can be used to map out the large scale Baryon Acoustic Oscillation (BAO) structure of the universe. The BAO are a fixed comoving size, and so they act as a standard ruler, marking the expansion of the universe over time, and therefore giving information about dark energy and dark matter. For example, if dark energy is not a cosmological constant, as the standard ΛCDM theory of cosmology predicts, then the rate of acceleration of the universe may not be constant over time.

Due to the expansion of the universe, the 400-800 MHz operating band of the HIRAX instrument corresponds to redshifted 21-cm emission from $0.8 < z < 2.5$ (7-11Bya, or when the universe was between 2.5 and 6.5 billion years old). This range encompasses the period when the standard ΛCDM cosmological model predicts that dark energy is beginning to affect the dynamics of the universe, causing it to transition from decelerating expansion to accelerating expansion.

The HIRAX array will survey most of the southern sky to map out BAO, and its large field of view and large survey area will additionally make it a very powerful tool for detecting radio transient events. In particular, HIRAX will be extremely efficient at detecting Fast Radio Bursts (FRBs) and Pulsars. FRBs are short (~1 ms) bright (~1 Jy) radio bursts, whose origins are completely unknown. Only approximately 612 have been detected as of 2021, but the HIRAX array expects to detect tens of FRBs per day. Pulsars are rapidly rotating neutron stars, whose rotation causes them to appear to emit radio frequency pulses at very regular rates. Precise measurements of the rates of their pulses could be used to detect gravitational waves, because the gravitational waves would distort the size of the space the pulses travel through, and thus their arrival times at Earth.

The Canadian Hydrogen Intensity Mapping Experiment (CHIME) is a sister experiment to HIRAX. It has similar science objectives, but observes in the Northern Hemisphere, and has different instrumental systematics. The Canadian Hydrogen Observatory and Radio-transient Detector (CHORD) is a next-generation radio telescope, proposed for construction to start immediately. CHORD is a pan-Canadian project, designed to work with and build on the success of the CHIME. It will act as a sister experiment to HIRAX. CHORD will incorporate CHIME’s best innovations alongside new Canadian technology. Small cylinders derived from the CHIME design and operating from 400-800MHz will be deployed at remote outrigger sites and provide milli-arcsecond-level localization of radio transients. These will be complemented by focused arrays of 6m composite dishes at each site, instrumented with novel ultra-wideband (UWB) feeds, covering a 5:1 radio band from 300–1500MHz.

== Instrument ==
The HIRAX array will consist of 1024 6-meter diameter parabolic dish reflectors with a field of view of 5–10°. The dishes will not be steered, but fixed in position and sweep the sky as the Earth rotates. Every few months, they will be manually re-pointed in elevation to survey a new strip of the sky.

The dishes are extremely deep, with an f-number of 0.23, to shield the feeds from ground pickup, and crosstalk from neighboring dishes in the array. The antennas have been optimized to have low loss and high reflectivity across the 400–800 MHz observing band of the telescope. Each dish is coupled to a single dual-polarization clover-leaf dipole antenna. The signal is amplified by a pair of low-noise amplifiers (LNAs), and transmitted to a centralized computation structure (the "back end") by means of fibre-optic links.

At the back end the signal is amplified further by analog amplifier chains, then digitized and correlated with the signals from all other dishes to produce a single coherent image from the whole array. The digitization and frequency channelization operations will be performed by custom field programmable gate array (FPGA) boards, and the correlation will be run on a custom graphics processing unit (GPU) based high performance computing cluster. This correlation operation is extremely computationally expensive, and is the primary reason why such large interferometric arrays have not previously been fielded. In full array operation, HIRAX will be required to process 6.5 Tb of data per second, which is comparable to the total international internet bandwidth for the continent of Africa. This problem is made feasible by recent advances in GPU based computing, and by the regular spacing between the array elements, which lowers the computational difficulty from $O(n^2)$ to $O(n \log n)$, where n is the number of elements in the array.

== Status ==
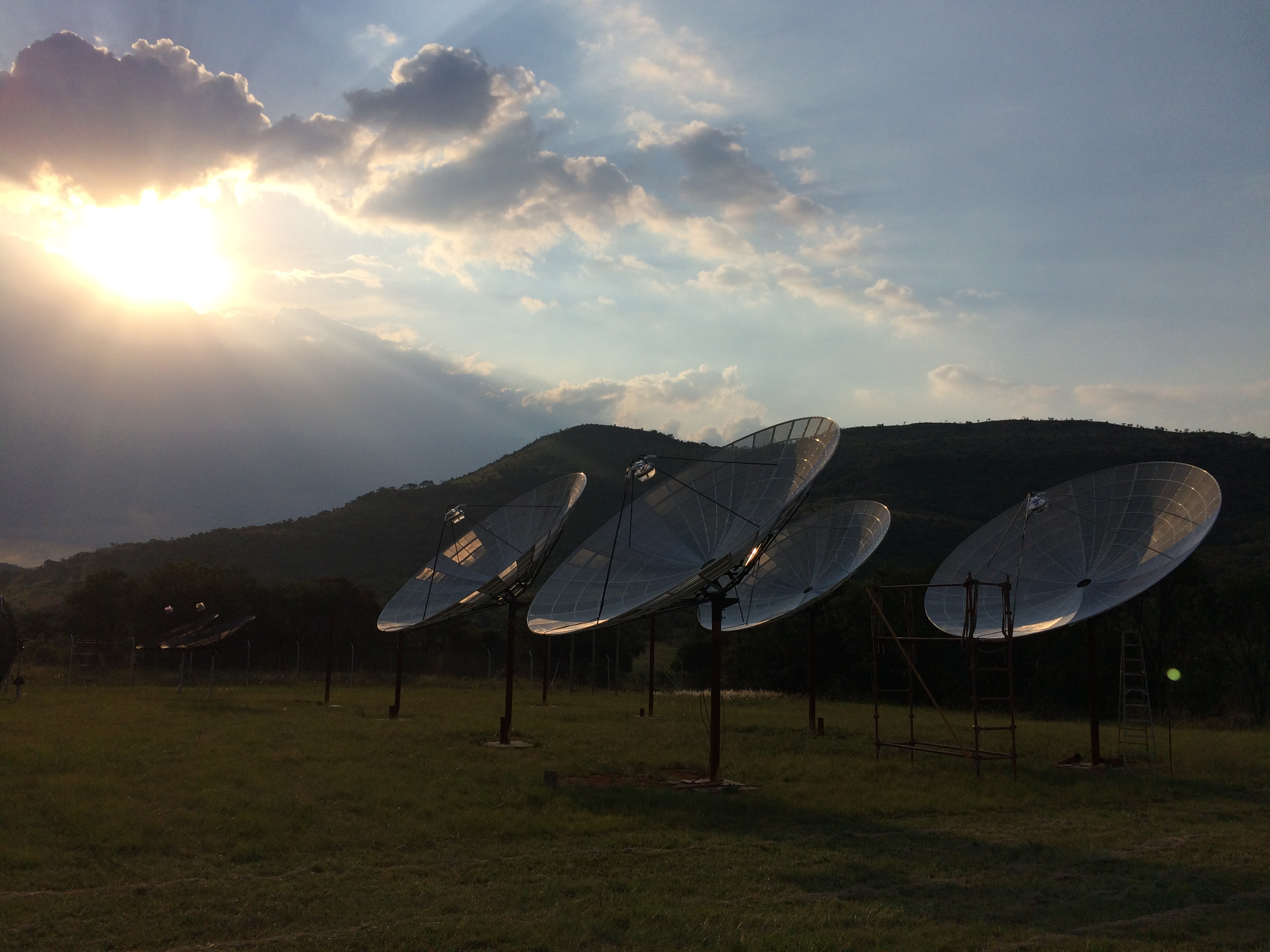
The HIRAX prototype telescope array at HartRAO in 2017.

The HIRAX collaboration fielded an 8-element prototype array at the Hartebeesthoek Radio Astronomy Observatory (HartRAO) in 2017, which is used as a test bed for hardware and software development leading up to the construction of the full array at the South African Radio Astronomy Observatory (SARAO) site in the Karoo. Construction of a 128-element pathfinder array is slated to begin in 2024. The pathfinder array will then be expanded out to the full 1024-element array over the course of the following three years. The HartRAO 8-element array will be incorporated into the full array as an "outrigger" array, along with several others throughout southern Africa. These outriggers will dramatically improve the angular resolution of the HIRAX array, allowing it to localize FRB detections with sub-arcsecond precision.

The University of KwaZulu-Natal, and the South African Department of Science and Technology and National Research Foundation announced the official launch of the HIRAX experiment in August 2018.

== See also ==
- Baryon acoustic oscillations
- Fast radio burst
- Intensity mapping
- List of radio telescopes
