= Etherington's reciprocity theorem =

The Etherington distance-duality equation is the relationship between the luminosity distance of standard candles and the angular diameter distance. The equation is as follows: $d_L=(1+z)^2 d_A$, where $z$ is the redshift, $d_L$ is the luminosity distance and $d_A$ the angular-diameter distance.

== History and derivations ==
When Ivor Etherington introduced this equation in 1933, he mentioned that this equation was proposed by Tolman as a way to test a cosmological model. Ellis proposed a proof of this equation in the context of Riemannian geometry. A quote from Ellis: "The core of the reciprocity theorem is the fact that many geometric properties are invariant when the roles of the source and observer in astronomical observations are transposed". This statement is fundamental in the derivation of the reciprocity theorem.

== Validation from astronomical observations ==
The Etherington's distance-duality equation has been validated from astronomical observations based on the X-ray surface brightness and the Sunyaev–Zel'dovich effect of galaxy clusters. The reciprocity theorem is considered to be true when photon number is conserved, gravity is described by a metric theory with photons traveling on unique null geodesics. Any violation of the distance duality would be attributed to exotic physics provided that astrophysical effects altering the cosmic distance measurements are well below the statistical errors. For instance, an incorrect modelling of the three-dimensional gas density profile in galaxy clusters may introduce systematic uncertainties in the determination of the cluster angular diameter distance from X-ray and/or SZ observations, thus altering the outcome of the distance-duality test. Similarly, unaccounted extinction from a diffuse dust component in the inter-galactic medium can affect the determination of luminosity distances and cause a violation of the distance-duality relation.

== See also ==
- Distance measures (cosmology)
