= BINGO (telescope) =

Radio telescope under construction in Brazil

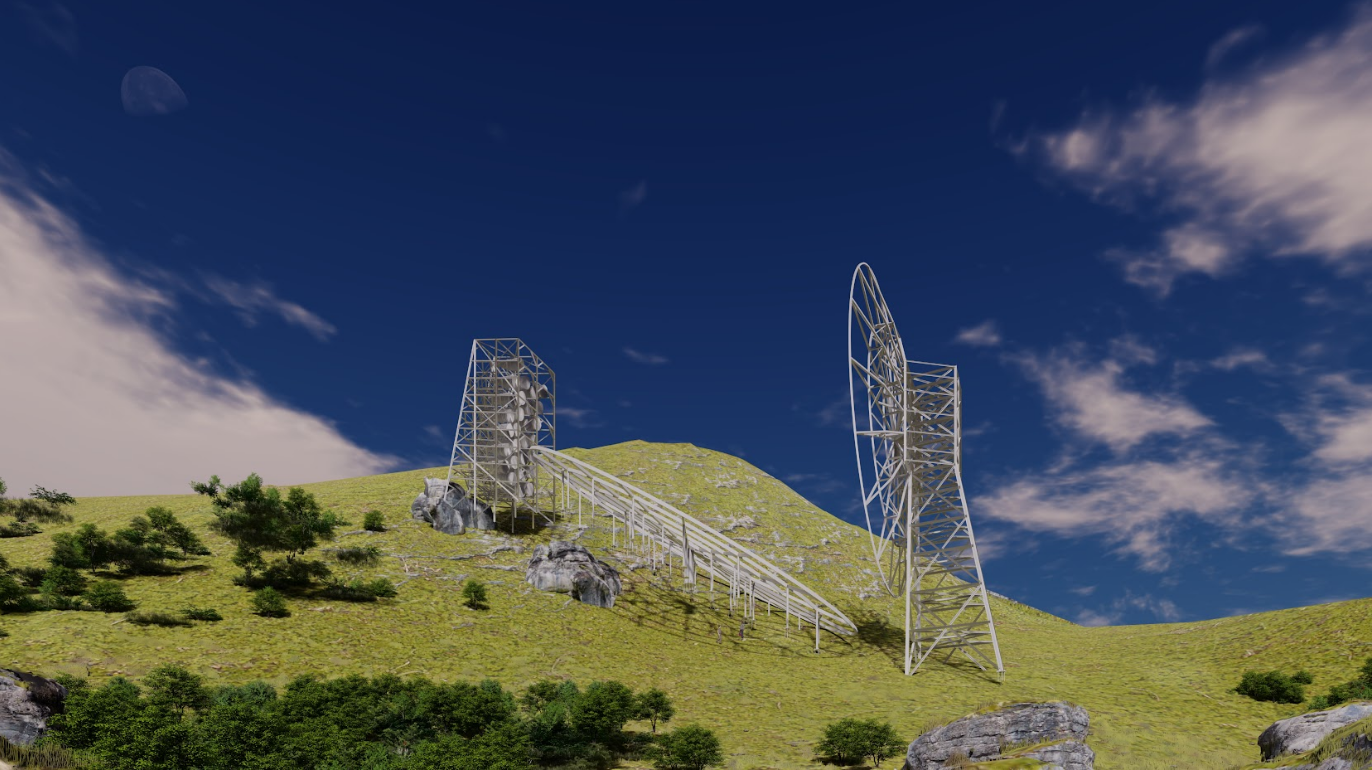
- Alternative names: Baryon Acoustic Oscillations in Neutral Gas Observations
- Location(s): Aguiar, Paraíba, Brazil
- Coordinates: 7°02′57″S 38°15′46″W
- Wavelength: 23.79 cm (1.260 GHz)–30.59 cm (980 MHz)
- Diameter: 40 m (131 ft 3 in)
- Secondary diameter: 35.6 m (116 ft 10 in)
- Website: www.bingotelescope.org
- Location of BINGO
- Related media on Commons

BINGO (Baryon Acoustic Oscillations from Integrated Neutral Gas Observations) is a 40 m (130 ft) transit radio telescope currently under construction that will observe redshifted hydrogen line emission (between z = 0.13 and 0.45) by intensity mapping to measure dark energy through baryon acoustic oscillations (BAO) in the radio frequency band.

The BINGO Project is an international collaboration headed by University of São Paulo, and also collaborates with researches from many countries, such as Brazil (National Institute of Space Research and Federal University of Campina Grande), China (University of Yangzhou) and England (University of Manchester), besides support from institutions as Shanghai Jiao Tong (China), Institute for Basic Science (South Korea), IAP - Institut d'Astrophysique de Paris (France), University of Rome (Italy), IAC - Instituto de Astrofísica de Canarias (Spain), Max Planck Institute (Germany), KwaZulu-Natal University (South Africa), Universidade Federal de Itajuba (Brazil) and Universidade Federal do Cariri (Brazil).

The radio telescope is financed mainly by the Fundação de Amparo à Pesquisa do Estado de São Paulo (FAPESP) and by the Paraíba State Government, being supervised by the researcher Elcio Abdalla, from the Institute of Physics of University of São Paulo.

BINGO will consist of two mirrors: the 40-meter primary mirror reflects radiation from the sky to the secondary mirror that then directs the radiation to a focal plane of 28 horns. The signals will then be focused into a receiver and a spectrometer, after which the data will be analyzed through a data analysis pipeline on a computer.

The radio telescope will be installed in the Serra do Urubu, near the city of Aguiar, Paraíba, in Brazil's northeast. Other locations were evaluated in Uruguay, Rio Grande do Sul, São Paulo and Goiás. The choice of locality in Paraíba was due to the low level of radio frequency interference at the site.

The telescope will operate in the frequency range from 0.98 GHz to 1.26 GHz. With a feedhorn array of 28 receivers, it will map a 15° declination strip as the sky drifts past the field-of-view of the telescope. In March 2018, the telescope assembly and horn design and fabrication were under way in Brazil. Completion of construction was expected around 2022.

== Science ==
Hydrogen is the most abundant element of the universe, composing approximately 75% of all usual known matter, also known as baryonic matter. It is available in many different ways, among which the neutral hydrogen (HI) is the most common one. According to quantum mechanics, only certain electronic transitions may occur, what limits the emitted photons energy, and thus which emission lines may be observed. Due to the interaction between the spin of the proton and the electron, there is a very small energy difference associated to the aligned spin state and the anti-parallel spin state, which produces a 21 cm wavelength photon, equivalent to a 1.4 GHz frequency. This process is called spin-flip transition, and is associated with the hydrogen fine structure.

== Social development ==
The BINGO radio telescope, currently under construction in São Paulo with installation taking place in the Piancó region in the Urubu mountain range, in the backlands of Paraíba, plays a catalytic role in regional development in both São Paulo and Northeast Brazil. In addition to its innovative and scientific advancements, the radio telescope presents a multitude of possibilities for regional and national growth.

Within this context, the project features a team of Education and Scientific Outreach comprising researchers, educators, science communicators, journalists, and other communication professionals. This interdisciplinary team is actively involved in the construction and strengthening of a scientific culture. Collaborative efforts between the Institute of Physics and the Center for Communication and Education at USP, the Advanced Journalism Studies Laboratory at Unicamp, and the UFCG are focused on developing initiatives in both São Paulo and Paraíba dedicated to scientific education and outreach.

The Piancó region is characterized as one of the economically disadvantaged areas in the state of Paraíba, with educational indicators below the state average. Moreover, it has the lowest access to higher education in the region. Although infrastructure projects such as fiber optic cabling and resources for digital governance systems are underway in Piancó cities, the effective implementation of these initiatives is limited due to a scarcity of specialized professionals in the region.

The BINGO radio telescope has significant potential to intervene in regional production systems, contributing to the enhancement of workforce training and driving the economy in underserved areas. The actions developed in this region aim not only to create new employment opportunities but also to provide new perspectives to citizens through the establishment and strengthening of a local scientific culture.

Considering that BINGO will become an integral part of daily life for people in the Piancó region, we can leverage the natural curiosity surrounding the installation of the radio telescope to promote the formation of a scientific culture in local schools. In the town of Aguiar, where the BINGO radio telescope is being installed, cosmology plays a fundamental role in establishing and strengthening a STEAM (Science, Technology, Engineering, Arts, and Mathematics) culture. This work is carried out with the support of the Federal University of Campina Grande (UFCG), which has allocated resources for this purpose.

UFCG maintains a campus in Cajazeiras, the largest city in the backlands of Paraíba, focused on teacher training. The BINGO project includes the construction of a science museum dedicated to astronomy in the backlands, where the control room for the radio telescope will also be installed. This museum will play a central role in scientific outreach and serve as a hub for educational activities and future postgraduate courses in the field. The BINGO radio telescope has a dedicated team for Education and Scientific Outreach. The project is currently under construction in São Paulo and will be installed in the backlands of Paraíba, in the region known as Piancó. In addition to its innovative potential and scientific development, the radio telescope offers various possibilities for driving regional development, both in São Paulo and the Northeast of Brazil.

In this context, the Education and Scientific Outreach team is composed of researchers, educators, science communicators, journalists, and other communication professionals. This team is committed to building and strengthening a scientific culture in the region. The Institute of Physics and the Center for Communication and Education at USP, the Advanced Journalism Studies Laboratory at Unicamp, and the Federal University of Campina Grande are developing initiatives in São Paulo and Paraíba focused on scientific education and outreach.

The Piancó region is considered one of the poorest in Paraíba, with educational indicators below the state average and limited access to higher education. Although there are projects for fiber optic cabling and resources allocated for the creation of digital governance systems in the cities of the region, the lack of specialized professionals hinders the effective implementation of these initiatives.

The BINGO project has the potential to intervene in the region's production systems, contributing to the improvement of workforce training and boosting the economy in disadvantaged areas. The actions developed in the region aim not only to create new job opportunities but also to promote a new perspective for citizens through the establishment and strengthening of a scientific culture.

Since the BINGO radio telescope will become part of the daily lives of people in the Piancó region, we can take advantage of the natural curiosity surrounding its installation to promote the formation of a scientific culture in local schools.

== Education ==
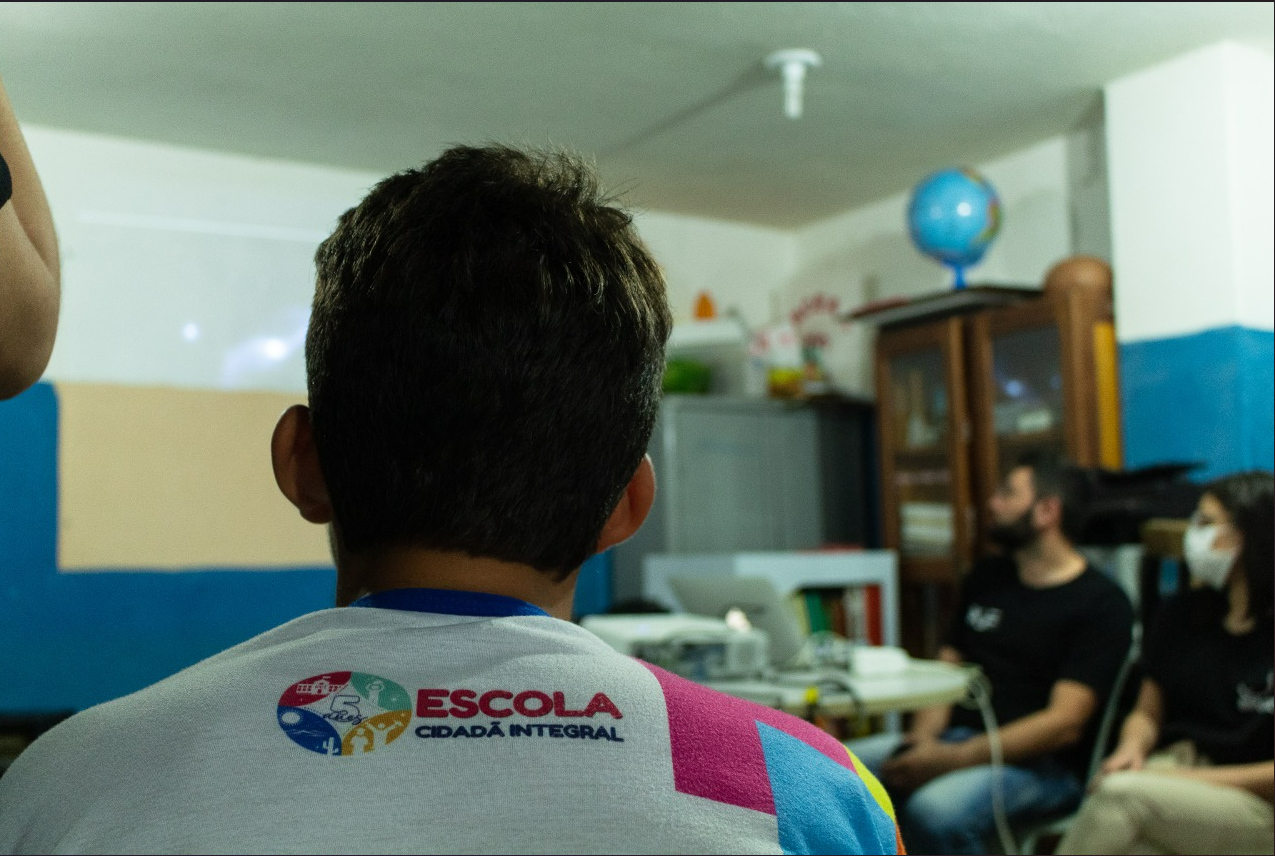
Scientific dissemination in educational networks.

The BINGO radio telescope plays a fundamental role in promoting scientific research and training specialists for higher education, thus driving the construction of scientific knowledge and the development of professionals for the national market.

The BINGO project has been the subject of study by students ranging from undergraduate to doctoral levels in various participating institutions. In Brazil, these students receive scholarships and grants provided by the São Paulo Research Foundation (FAPESP), the Coordination for the Improvement of Higher Education Personnel (CAPES), the National Council for Scientific and Technological Development (CNPq), and the Pro-Rectorate for Research and Extension of the (Federal University of Campina Grande).

== Design ==
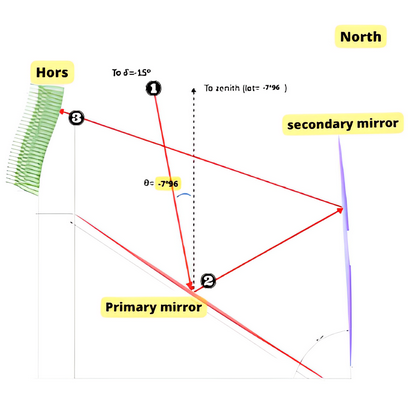
Entry of radio waves coming from space and their path to the horn antennas

The BINGO is a radio telescope with a Crossed Dragone optical design. This design utilizes two main mirrors to capture and direct the incoming radiation from the sky. The primary mirror has a paraboloidal shape with a semi-minor axis of 20 meters radius, and its function is to capture the radiation. This radiation is then reflected onto the secondary mirror, which has a hyperboloidal shape with a semi-minor axis of 17.8 meters, directing the signals to the focal plane where the 28 horn antennas are located.

In the focal plane, there are 28 horn antennas that collect the radiation for the receivers. The arrangement of these horn antennas follows a scheme called Double Rectangular, where four columns of seven horn antennas are placed side by side. This arrangement allows each horn antenna to cover the observation gap of the other, enabling a more uniform observation of the sky (the mapping of the sky is achieved through the rotation of the Earth). This arrangement decision was made considering that the BINGO is a transit telescope, meaning it employs the drift scan strategy. In this strategy, the telescope is pointed towards a region of fixed altitude and azimuth, and the mapping of the sky is achieved through the rotation of the Earth.

The National Institute for Space Research (INPE) is involved in the development of the design, construction of prototypes, and testing of the horn antennas, as well as the electronic part of the radio telescope. Additionally, the INPE contributes to the development and testing of calibration techniques and data analysis. The institute is also part of the project's management committee.

== Technology and Innovation ==
Horn antenna of the BINGO radio telescope

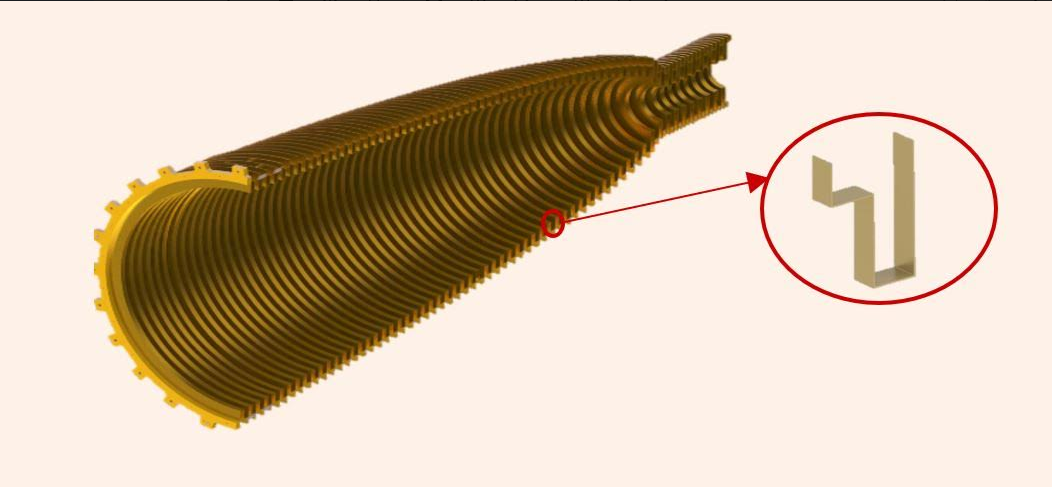
Image of the horn. The detail shows the internal profile

The BINGO radio telescope was designed with an emphasis on cost reduction compared to other equipment of the same category globally. While some of the electronic components are already available in the market, three key elements of the radio telescope - the horns, the polarimeter waveguides (or magic-tees), and the digital backends - present technological challenges that are being overcome by the project's team of researchers.

The technology and processes used to develop and construct these components have applications in various fields and offer opportunities for the domestic industry.

The horns are the elements responsible for the high sensitivity required in detecting cosmic signals.

The prototype was developed at the National Institute for Space Research ( INPE), with INPE researchers and engineers providing training and guidance to the local industry in building the prototype. This technological advancement represents a significant outcome that can contribute to the development of the national telecommunications industry, enabling the development of new antenna construction techniques.

The horns are composed of extruded aluminum rings in a chair-like shape, developed by the project's team of researchers and engineers. This profile allows for production optimization, reducing the use of raw materials and consequently lowering project costs.

== Installation ==
The radio telescope will be installed in Serra do Urubu, in the municipality of Aguiar, Paraíba. Several locations were evaluated, including Uruguay, Rio Grande do Sul, São Paulo, and Goiás. The choice of the location in Paraíba was based on it having the lowest level of Radio Frequency Interference (RFI) among the considered options.

Currently, the Uirapuru radio telescope is operational, installed at the Federal University of Campina Grande. It consists of a horn antenna that is being used for operational tests before the installation of the BINGO horn antennas. In the future, the Uirapuru will serve as a prototype for a set of detectors called "outriggers," designed to enhance BINGO's search for FRB signals.

== Papers ==
1) The BINGO project - I. Baryon acoustic oscillations from integrated neutral gas observations.

2) The BINGO project - II. Instrument description.

3) The BINGO Project - III. Optical design and optimization of the focal plane.

4) The BINGO project - IV. Simulations for mission performance assessment and preliminary component separation step.

5) The BINGO Project V: Further steps in Component Separation and Bispectrum Analysis.

6) The BINGO project - VI. H I halo occupation distribution and mock building.

7) The BINGO Project VII: Cosmological Forecasts from 21-cm Intensity Mapping.

8) The BINGO project - VIII. Recovering the BAO signal in HI intensity mapping simulations.

9) Baryon acoustic oscillations from Integrated Neutral Gas Observations: Broadband corrugated horn construction and testing.

10) Baryon Acoustic Oscillations from Integrated Neutral Gas Observations: an instrument to observe the 21cm hydrogen line in the redshift range 0.13 < z < 0.45 – status update.

11) Baryon acoustic oscillations from Integrated Neutral Gas Observations: Radio frequency interference measurements and telescope site selection.

12) Testing synchrotron models and frequency resolution in BINGO 21 cm simulated maps using GNILC.

== Consortium ==
BINGO is funded by the Foundation for Research Support of the State of São Paulo (FAPESP), MCTIC – FINEP. The Institutions participating in the BINGO Project are:

- Brazil: University of São Paulo (USP), Instituto Nacional de Pesquisas Espaciais (INPE), Universidade Federal de Campina Grande (UFCG), Universidade Federal de Itajubá (UNIFEI), Universidade Federal do Cariri (UFCA)
- China: YangZhou University, Shanghai Jiao Tong University
- United Kingdom: University of Manchester
- France: Université Paris-Sud - Institute d'Astrophysique Spatiale
