= Ivor Etherington =

British mathematician (1908–1994)

Ivor Malcolm Haddon Etherington FRSE (8 February 1908 – 1 January 1994) was a British mathematician. He worked initially on general relativity, and later on genetics where he introduced genetic algebras.

== Life ==
He was born in Lewisham in London, the posthumous son of the Baptist missionary Bruce Etherington (1874–1907) and his missionary wife Annie Margaret. His father had died in Ceylon, leaving his mother and two older siblings to return to Britain alone. His mother remarried in 1913 to Edwin Duncombe de Rusett, a Baptist minister, but Ivor retained his original surname.

In 1921 the growing family moved out of London to Thorpe Bay on the Essex coast, where Ivor's step-father then founded the Thorpe Hall School for Boys. In 1922 Ivor was sent back to London to be educated at Mill Hill School. Ivor was later educated at the University of Oxford and continued as a postgraduate at the University of Edinburgh where he received his doctorate. He later became a professor of mathematics at the same university.

Etherington was elected a Fellow of the Royal Society of Edinburgh in 1934. His proposers were Sir Edmund Whittaker, Herbert Westren Turnbull, Edward Thomas Copson and David Gibb. He won the Society's Keith Medal for 1955–57. His doctoral students include Henryk Minc.

On his retirement in 1974, Etherington moved with his wife to Easdale on the Scottish west coast, where the family had always had a holiday home. He died on 1 January 1994.

== Family ==
He married Elizabeth (Betty) Goulding in 1934. They had two daughters, Donia and Judy. When Betty died in 1982, Donia came to care for her father.

During World War II he and his wife aided 32 German refugees, giving many shelter in their own home.

== See also ==
- Etherington's reciprocity theorem
- Wedderburn–Etherington number
