= Planetary nebula luminosity function =

Astronomical function

Planetary nebula luminosity function (PNLF) is a secondary distance indicator used in astronomy. It makes use of the [O III] λ5007 forbidden line found in all planetary nebula (PNe) which are members of the old stellar populations (Population II). It can be used to determine distances to both spiral and elliptical galaxies despite their completely different stellar populations and is part of the Extragalactic Distance Scale.

== Procedure ==
The distance estimate to a galaxy using the PNLF requires discovery of such an object in the target galaxy that is visible at λ5007 but not when the entire spectrum is considered. These points are candidate PNe, however, there are three other types of objects that would also exhibit such an emission line that must be filtered out: HII regions, supernova remnants, and Lyα galaxies. After the PNe are determined, to estimate a distance one must measure their monochromatic [O III] λ5007 luminosity. What remains is a statistical sample of PNe. The observed luminosity function is then fitted to some standard law.

Finally, one must estimate the foreground interstellar extinction. The two sources of extinction, are from within the Milky Way and the internal extinction of the target galaxy. The first is well known and can be taken from sources such as reddening maps computed from H I measurements and galaxy counts or from IRAS and DIRBE satellite experiments. The later type of extinction, occurs only in target galaxies which are either late type spiral or irregular. However, this extinction is difficult to measure. In the Milky Way, the scale height of PNe is much bigger than that of the dust. Observational data and models support that this holds true for other galaxies, that the bright edge of the PNLF is primarily due to PNe in front of the dust layer. The data and models support a less than 0.05 apparent magnitude internal extinction of a galaxy's PNe.

== Physics behind process ==
The PNLF method is unbiased by metallicity. This is because oxygen is a primary nebular coolant; any drop in its concentration raises the plasma's electron temperature and raises the amount of collisional excitations per ion. This compensates for having a smaller number of emitting ions in the PNe resulting in little change in the λ5007 emissions . Consequently, a reduction in oxygen density only lowers the emergent [O III] λ5007 emission line intensity by approximately the square root of the difference in abundance. At the same time, the PNe's core responds to metallicity the opposite way. In the case where the metallicity of the progenitor star is smaller, the PNe's central star will be a bit more massive and its illuminating ultraviolet flux will be a bit greater. This added energy almost precisely accounts for the decreased emissions of the PNe. Consequently, the total [O III] λ5007 luminosity that is produced by a PNe is practically uncorrelated to metallicity. This beneficial negation is in agreement with more precise models of PNe evolution. Only in extremely metal-poor PNe does the brightness of the PNLF cutoff dim by more than a small percentage.

The relative independence of the PNLF cutoff with respect to population age is harder to understand. The [O III] λ5007 flux of a PNe directly correlates to the brightness of its central star. Further, the brightness of its central star directly correlates to its mass and the central star's mass directly varies in relation to its progenitor's mass. However, by observation, it is demonstrated that reduced brightness does not happen.
