= Mattig formula =

Mattig's formula was an important formula in observational cosmology and extragalactic astronomy which gives relation between radial coordinate and redshift of a given source. It depends on the cosmological model being used and is used to calculate luminosity distance in terms of redshift.

It assumes zero dark energy, and is therefore no longer applicable in modern cosmological models such as the Lambda-CDM model, (which require a numerical integration to get the distance-redshift relation). However, Mattig's formula was of considerable historical importance as the first analytic formula for the distance-redshift relationship for arbitrary matter density, and this spurred significant research in the 1960s and 1970s attempting to measure this relation.

== Without dark energy ==
Derived by W. Mattig in a 1958 paper, the mathematical formulation of the relation is,

$r_1 = \frac{c}{R_0 H_0} \frac{q_0z+(q_0-1)(-1+\sqrt{1+2q_0z})}{q_0^2(1+z)}$

Where, $r_1=\frac{d_p}{R}=\frac{d_c}{R_0}$ is the radial coordinate distance (proper distance at present) of the source from the observer while $d_p$ is the proper distance and $d_c$ is the comoving distance.

$q_0=\Omega_0/2$ is the deceleration parameter while $\Omega_0$ is the density of matter in the universe at present.
$R_0$ is scale factor at present time while $R$ is scale factor at any other time.
$H_0$ is Hubble's constant at present and
$z$ is as usual the redshift.

This equation is only valid if $q_0 > 0$. When $q_0 \le 0$ the value of $r_1$ cannot be calculated. That follows from the fact that the derivation assumes no cosmological constant and, with no cosmological constant, $q_0$ is never negative.

From the radial coordinate we can calculate luminosity distance using the following formula,

$$D_L \ = \ R_0r_1(1+z) = \frac{c}{H_0q_0^2} \left[q_0z+(q_0-1)(-1+\sqrt{1+2q_0z})\right]$$

When $q_0=0$ we get another expression for luminosity distance using Taylor expansion,

$$D_L = \frac{c}{H_0}\left(z+\frac{z^2}{2}\right)$$

But in 1977 Terrell devised a formula which is valid for all $q_0 \ge 0$,

$$D_L = \frac{c}{H_0}z\left[1+\frac{z(1-q_0)}{1+q_0z+\sqrt{1+2q_0z}}\right]$$
