= Luminosity distance =

Astronomical measurement in mathematics

Luminosity distance D_{L} is defined in terms of the relationship between the absolute magnitude M and apparent magnitude m of an astronomical object.

$$M = m - 5 \log_{10}{\frac{D_L}{10\,\text{pc}}}\!\,$$

which gives:

$$D_L = 10^{\frac{(m - M)}{5}+1}$$

where D_{L} is measured in parsecs. For nearby objects (say, in the Milky Way) the luminosity distance gives a good approximation to the natural notion of distance in Euclidean space.

The relation is less clear for distant objects like quasars far beyond the Milky Way since the apparent magnitude is affected by spacetime curvature, redshift, and time dilation. Calculating the relation between the apparent and actual luminosity of an object requires taking all of these factors into account. The object's actual luminosity is determined using the inverse-square law and the proportions of the object's apparent distance and luminosity distance.

Another way to express the luminosity distance is through the flux-luminosity relationship,

$$F = \frac{L}{4\pi D_L^2}$$

where F is flux (W·m^{−2}), and L is luminosity (W). From this the luminosity distance (in meters) can be expressed as:

$$D_L = \sqrt{\frac{L}{4\pi F}}$$

The luminosity distance is related to the "comoving transverse distance" $D_M$ by

$$D_L = (1 + z) D_M$$

and with the angular diameter distance $D_A$ by the Etherington's reciprocity theorem:

$$D_L = (1 + z)^2 D_A$$

where z is the redshift. $D_M$ is a factor that allows calculation of the comoving distance between two objects with the same redshift but at different positions of the sky; if the two objects are separated by an angle $\delta \theta$, the comoving distance between them would be $D_M \delta \theta$. In a spatially flat universe, the comoving transverse distance $D_M$ is exactly equal to the radial comoving distance $D_C$, i.e. the comoving distance from ourselves to the object.

== See also ==
- Distance measure
- Distance modulus
