= Aguiar, Paraíba =

Coordinates: 7°05′31″S 38°10′15″W

- Municipality
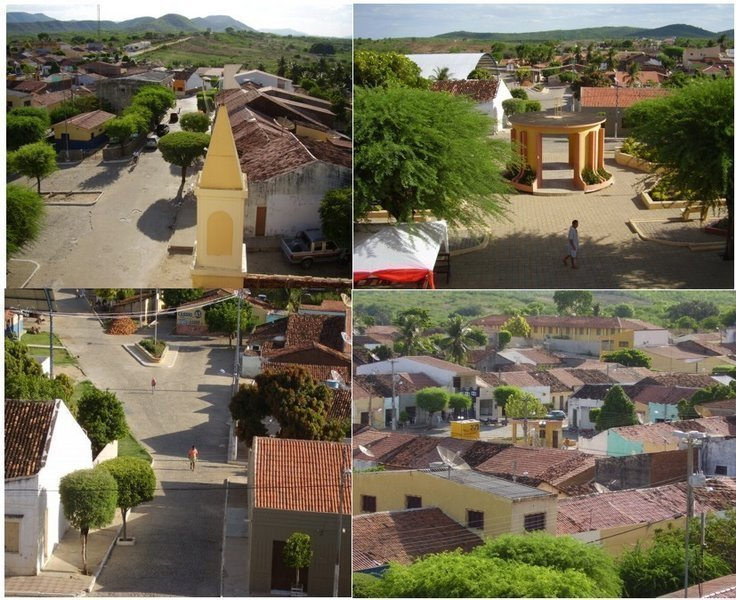

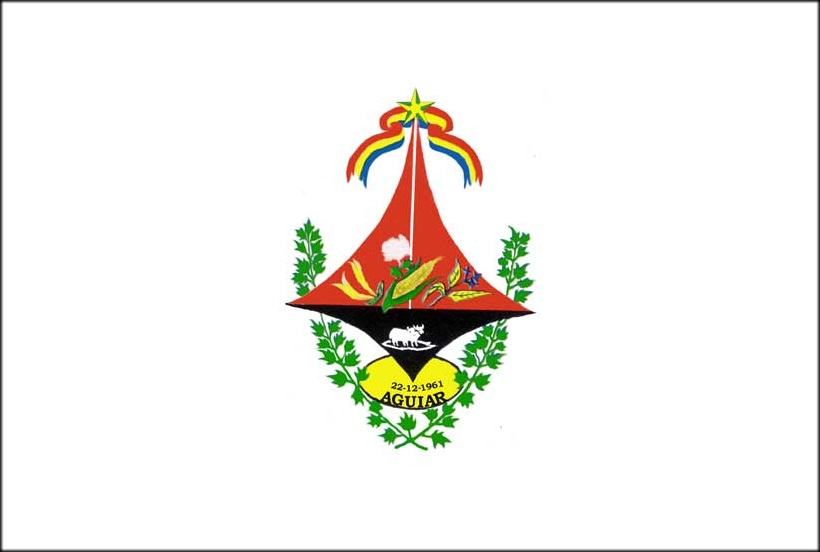
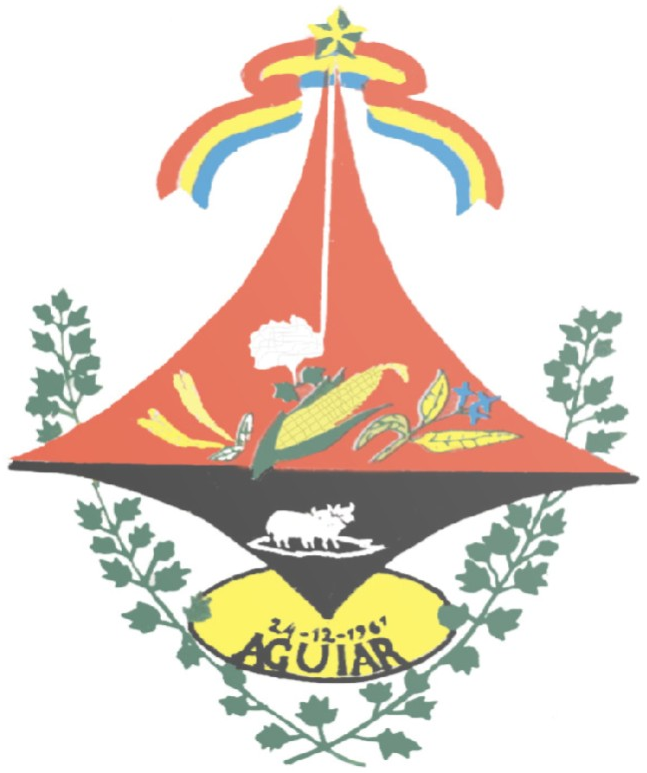
- Flag Coat of arms
- Interactive map of Aguiar, Paraíba
- Country: Brazil
- Region: Northeast
- State: Paraíba
- Mesoregion: Sertao Paraibana

Population (2020)
  - Total: 5,630
- Time zone: UTC−3 (BRT)

Aguiar, Paraíba is a municipality in the state of Paraíba in the Northeast Region of Brazil.

== See also ==
- List of municipalities in Paraíba
