= Standard ruler =

Astronomical object of known size

A standard ruler is an astronomical object for which the actual physical size is known. By measuring its angular size in the sky, one can use simple trigonometry to determine its distance from Earth. In simple terms, this is because objects of a fixed size appear smaller the further away they are.

Measuring distances is of great importance in cosmology, as the relationship between the distance and redshift of an object can be used to measure the expansion rate and geometry of the Universe. Distances can also be measured using standard candles; many different types of standard candles and rulers are needed to construct the cosmic distance ladder.

Baryon acoustic oscillations are considered to be essential standard rulers for measuring large-scale structures in the universe.

== Relationship between angular size and distance ==
The relation between the angular diameter (θ), actual (physical) size (r), and distance (D) of an object from the observer is given by:

$$D \approx \frac{r}{\theta}$$

where θ is measured in radians.

Because space is expanding, there is no single unique way of measuring the distance between source and observer. The distance measured by a standard ruler is known as the angular diameter distance. Standard candles measure another type of distance called the luminosity distance.

== See also ==
- Standard candle – Class of astronomical object of known luminosity
- Baryon acoustic oscillations – Fluctuations in the density of the normal matter of the universe - standard ruler
- Standard siren – Gravitational waves originating from the inspiral phase of compact binary system
- Angular diameter distance – Astronomical concept
- Parallax – Difference in the apparent position of an object viewed along two different lines of sight
- Cosmic distance ladder – Succession of methods by which astronomers determine the distances to celestial objects
