= Angular diameter distance =

Astronomical concept

In astronomy, angular diameter distance is a distance (in units of length) defined in terms of an object's physical size (also in units of length), $x$, and its angular size (necessarily in radians), $\theta$, as viewed from Earth:
$$d_A= \frac{x}{\theta}$$

== Cosmology dependence ==
The angular diameter distance depends on the assumed cosmology of the universe. The angular diameter distance to an object at redshift, $z$, is expressed in terms of the comoving distance, $r$ as:

$$d_A = \frac{S_k(r)}{1+z}$$

where $S_k(r)$ is the FLRW coordinate defined as:

$$S_k(r) = \begin{cases}
\sin \left (H_0 \sqrt{|\Omega_k|} r \right)/\left(H_0\sqrt{|\Omega_k|}\right) & \Omega_k < 0\\
r & \Omega_k=0 \\
\sinh \left(H_0 \sqrt{|\Omega_k|} r\right)/\left(H_0\sqrt{|\Omega_k|}\right) & \Omega_k >0
\end{cases}$$

where $\Omega_k$ is the curvature density and $H_0$ is the value of the Hubble parameter today.

In the Lambda-CDM model, the currently favoured geometric model of our Universe, the "angular diameter distance" of an object is a good approximation to the "real distance", i.e. the proper distance when the light left the object.

== Angular size redshift relation ==
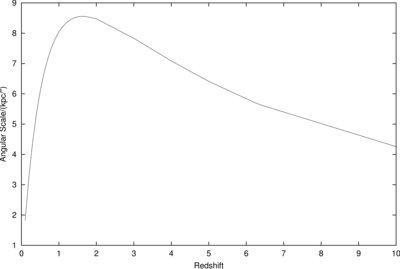
The angular size redshift relation for a Lambda cosmology, with kiloparsecs per arcsecond on the vertical scale.

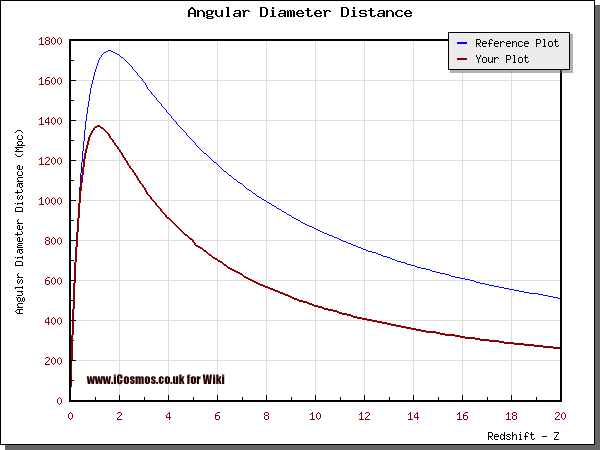
The angular size redshift relation for a Lambda cosmology, with megaparsecs on the vertical scale.

The angular size redshift relation describes the relation between the angular size observed on the sky of an object of given physical size, and the object's redshift from Earth (which is related to its distance, $d$, from Earth). In a Euclidean geometry the relation between size on the sky and distance from Earth would simply be given by the equation:

$$\tan\left ( \theta \right )= \frac{x}{d} .$$

where $\theta$ is the angular size of the object on the sky, $x$ is the size of the object and $d$ is the distance to the object. Where $\theta$ is small this approximates to:

$$\theta \approx \frac{x}{d}.$$

However, in the ΛCDM model, the relation is more complicated. In this model, objects at redshifts greater than about 1.5 appear larger on the sky with increasing redshift.

This is related to the angular diameter distance, which is the distance an object is calculated to be at from $\theta$ and $x$, assuming the Universe is Euclidean.

The Mattig relation yields the angular-diameter distance, $d_A$, as a function of redshift z for a universe with Ω_{Λ} = 0. $q_0$ is the present-day value of the deceleration parameter, which measures the deceleration of the expansion rate of the Universe; in the simplest models, $q_0<0.5$ corresponds to the case where the Universe will expand forever, $q_0>0.5$ to closed models which will ultimately stop expanding and contract, $q_0=0.5$ corresponds to the critical case – Universes which will just be able to expand to infinity without re-contracting.

$$d_A=\cfrac{c}{H_0 q^2_0} \cfrac{(zq_0+(q_0 -1)(\sqrt{2q_0 z+1}-1))}{(1+z)^2}$$
This formula however is invalid, since the value of Λ ≫ 0 and $q_0$ ≪ 0.

=== Angular diameter turnover point ===
The angular diameter distance $d_A$ reaches a maximum at a redshift $z=z_t$ (in the ΛCDM model, this occurs at $z_t \approx 1.5$), such that the slope of $d_A(z)$ changes sign at $z=z_t$, or $\partial_z d_A > 0 ~ \forall z<z_t$, $\partial_z d_A < 0 ~ \forall z>z_t$. In reference to its appearance when plotted, $z_t$ is sometimes referred to as the turnover point. At this point also $d_A = r_{Ht} = c/H_t$. Practically, this means that if we look at objects at increasing redshift (and thus objects that are increasingly far away) those at greater redshift will span a smaller angle on the sky only until $z=z_t$, above which the objects will begin to span greater angles on the sky at greater redshift. The turnover point seems paradoxical because it contradicts our intuition that the farther something is, the smaller it will appear.

The turnover point occurs because of the expansion of the universe and because we observe distant galaxies as they were in the past. Because the universe is expanding, a pair of distant objects that are now distant from each other were closer to each other at earlier times. Because the speed of light is finite, the light reaching us from this pair of objects must have left them long ago when they were nearer to one another and spanned a larger angle on the sky. The turnover point can therefore tell us about the rate of expansion of the universe (or the relationship between the expansion rate and the speed of light if we do not assume the latter to be constant).

== See also ==
- Distance measure
- Standard ruler
