= Correlation function (astronomy) =

Function describing the distribution of galaxies in the universe

In astronomy, a correlation function describes the distribution of objects (often stars or galaxies) in the universe. By default, "correlation function" refers to the two-point autocorrelation function. The two-point autocorrelation function is a function of one variable (distance); it describes the excess probability of finding two galaxies separated by this distance (excess over and above the probability that would arise if the galaxies were simply scattered independently and with uniform probability). It can be thought of as a "clumpiness" factor - the higher the value for some distance scale, the more "clumpy" the universe is at that distance scale.

From every pair in a distribution of galaxies, the two-point correlation function is calculated by counting the number of pairs that are separated by distances in various bins.

The following definition (from Peebles 1980) is often cited:

Given a random galaxy in a location, the correlation function describes the probability that another galaxy will be found within a given distance.

However, it can only be correct in the statistical sense that it is averaged over a large number of galaxies chosen as the first, random galaxy. If just one random galaxy is chosen, then the definition is no longer correct, firstly because it is meaningless to talk of just one "random" galaxy, and secondly because the function will vary wildly depending on which galaxy is chosen, in contradiction with its definition as a function.

Assuming the universe is isotropic (which observations suggest), the correlation function is a function of a scalar distance. The two-point correlation function can then be written as $\xi_2(\left| \mathbf x_1 - \mathbf x_2 \right|) = \langle \delta(\mathbf x_1) \delta(\mathbf x_2) \rangle,$ where $\delta(\mathbf x) = (\rho(\mathbf x) - \bar\rho)/\bar\rho$ is a unitless measure of overdensity, defined at every point. Letting $\Delta = \left| \mathbf x_1 - \mathbf x_2 \right|$, it can also be expressed as the integral $\xi_2(\Delta) = \frac{1}{V} \int d^3 x \, \delta(\mathbf x) \delta(\mathbf x + \mathbf \Delta) .$

The spatial correlation function $\xi(r)$ is related to the Fourier space power spectrum of the galaxy distribution, $P(k)$, as $\xi(r) = \frac{1}{2\pi^2} \int dk \, k^2 P(k) \, \frac{\sin(kr)}{kr}$

The n-point autocorrelation functions for n greater than 2 or cross-correlation functions for particular object types are defined similarly to the two-point autocorrelation function.

The correlation function is important for theoretical models of physical cosmology because it provides a means of testing models which assume different things about the contents of the universe.

== See also ==
- Ripley's K and Besag's L function
- Correlation function in statistics
- Spatial point process
