= NGT =

NGT may refer to:

- Dutch Sign Language ("Nederlandse Gebarentaal")
- Nasogastric tube
- Nigeria's Got Talent, Nigerian talent show
- The Nonsymmetric gravitational theory of John Moffat
- Nova Geração de Televisão, a Brazilian television network
- Nominal Group Technique, a group decision-making process
- New Generation Transport, proposal for a trolleybus scheme in Leeds, England
- National Green Tribunal Act, Indian environmental measure
- Next Generation Train, a German high-speed rail research project
- Newington railway station, Kent, England (National Rail station code NGT)
