= Andreas Albrecht (cosmologist) =

American physicist

Andreas J. Albrecht is a theoretical physicist and cosmologist who is a professor and chair of the physics department at the University of California, Davis. He is one of the founders of inflationary cosmology and studies the formation of the early universe, cosmic structure, and dark energy.

== Life and career ==
Albrecht graduated in 1979 from Cornell University and was awarded a doctorate in 1983 at University of Pennsylvania, Philadelphia on cosmology. His thesis advisor was Paul Steinhardt.

He later carried out post-doctoral research at University of Texas, Austin and at Los Alamos National Laboratory. Albrecht later worked at Fermilab from 1987 to 1992 and subsequently taught at Imperial College, London from 1992 to 1998.

Albrecht is a Fellow of the American Physical Society and Fellow of the Institute of Physics (UK).

== Work ==
Together with his thesis advisor, Albrecht developed New Inflation, solving the bubble collision problem of Alan Guth's original model of inflation. Later, Albrecht studied the observable effects of cosmic topological defects, contributing to ruling out cosmic strings as the dominant mechanism for structure formation.

Along with João Magueijo, Albrecht independently proposed a model of varying speed of light cosmology which posits that the speed of light in the early universe was a trillion times faster in order to explain the horizon problem of cosmology.

In the 21st century, Albrecht worked on quantum mechanics, as well as probability and quantum theory.

== See also ==
- Boltzmann brain
