= Cracking the Particle Code of the Universe: The Hunt for the Higgs Boson =

Book by John Moffat

- First edition
- Author: John W. Moffat
- Language: English
- Genre: Non-fiction
- Publisher: Oxford University Press
- Publication date: 2014
- Pages: 256 pp.
- ISBN: 978-0-19-991552-1 (hbk edition); ISBN 978-0-19-991553-8 (pbk edition); ISBN 978-0-19-938401-3 (e-book edition)
- OCLC: 864139970
- Preceded by: Einstein Wrote Back

Cracking the Particle Code of the Universe: The Hunt for the Higgs Boson is a 2014 popular science book by Canadian physicist John Moffat. The first half of the book gives the reader an explanation of the particle physicists' Standard Model and the physical concepts associated with it, together with some possible alternatives to, and extensions of, the Standard Model. In the second half of the book, Moffat gives his personal account (up to March 2013) of how the discovery of the Higgs boson actually happened at the Large Hadron Collider (LHC). He writes about conferences he attended and interviews with some of the LHC physicists.

The book received favorable reviews from Sabine Hossenfelder in Physics World and from Michael Peskin in Physics Today

== See also ==
- Reinventing Gravity, 2008 book by Moffat
- Einstein Wrote Back, 2010 book by Moffat
