= João Magueijo =

Portuguese cosmologist and academic (born 1967)

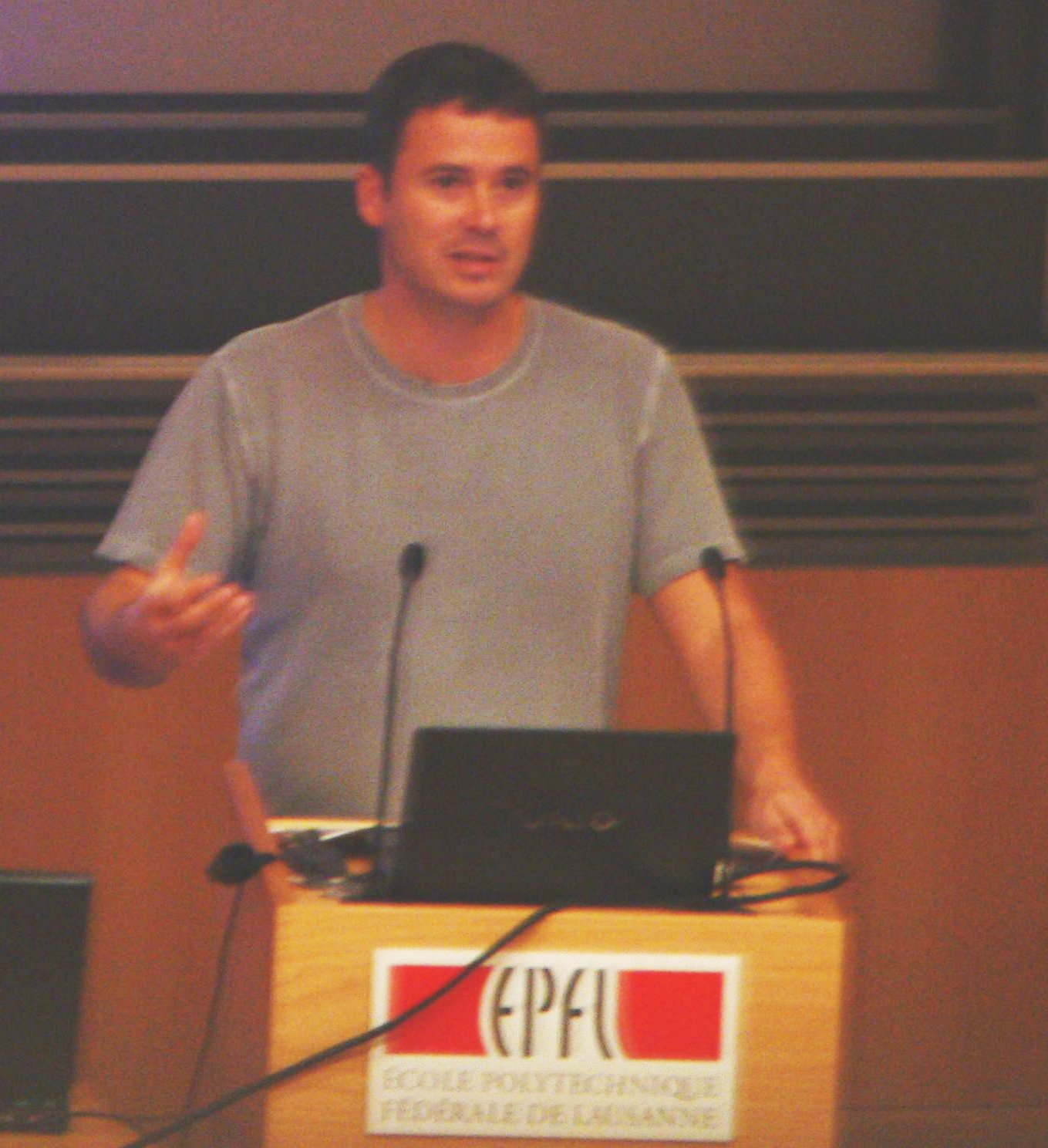
- João Magueijo at the journée de la Science at the EPFL, 11 November 2005
- Born: 27 July 1967 (age 59); Évora, Portugal
- Citizenship: Portuguese
- Education: University of Lisbon; Cambridge University
- Known for: Varying speed of light, Axis of Evil, Quantum Gravity/Cosmology
- Scientific career
- Fields: Physicist
- Workplaces: Imperial College
- Doctoral advisor: Anne-Christine Davis
- Doctoral students: Rachel Bean, Carlo Contaldi, Kate Land, Johannes Noller

João Magueijo (born 1967) is a Portuguese cosmologist and professor in theoretical physics at Imperial College London. He is a pioneer of the varying speed of light (VSL) theory.

== Education and career ==
João Magueijo studied physics at the University of Lisbon. He undertook graduate work and Ph.D. at Cambridge University. He was awarded a research fellowship at St John's College, Cambridge. He has been a faculty member at Princeton and Cambridge and is currently a professor at Imperial College London where he teaches undergraduates General Relativity and postgraduates Advanced General Relativity.

In 1998, Magueijo teamed with Andreas Albrecht to work on the varying speed of light (VSL) theory of cosmology, which proposes that the speed of light was up to 3×10^{30} km/s in the early universe. This would explain the horizon problem (since distant regions of the expanding universe would have had time to interact and homogenize their properties) and is presented as an alternative to the more mainstream theory of cosmic inflation.

Magueijo discusses his personal struggles pursuing VSL in his 2003 book, Faster Than The Speed of Light, The Story of a Scientific Speculation. He was associated with a misunderstanding over priority concerning VSL with John Moffat. He was also the host of the Science Channel special João Magueijo's Big Bang, which premiered on 13 May 2008.

In 2009, he published A Brilliant Darkness, an account of the life and science of vanished physicist Ettore Majorana.

In 2014, he published Bifes Mal Passados, describing his observations on the United Kingdom. In this book, Magueijo described British culture as one of the "most rotten societies in the world", and wrote that "When you visit English homes, or the toilets at schools or in student lodgings, they are all so disgusting that even my grandmother's poultry cage is cleaner". British people were described as "unrestrained wild beasts". The book was only published in Portugal, where it sold 20,000 copies.

João Magueijo has been interviewed by Morgan Freeman in season 2 of Through the Wormhole.

== See also ==
- Doubly special relativity

== Publications ==
=== Books ===
- Bifes Mal Passados: Passeios e outras catástrofes por terras de Sua Majestade, Gradiva, 2014, ISBN 978-989-616-583-3
- A Brilliant Darkness: The Extraordinary Life and Disappearance of Ettore Majorana, the Troubled Genius of the Nuclear Age, Basic Books, 2009/2010, ISBN 978-0-465-00903-9
- Faster than the Speed of Light: The Story of a Scientific Speculation, Basic Books, 2003, ISBN 978-07382-0525-0

=== Articles ===
- Albrecht, Andreas; Magueijo, João (1999). "Time varying speed of light as a solution to cosmological puzzles". Physical Review D. 59 (4) 043516. arXiv:astro-ph/9811018. Bibcode:1999PhRvD..59d3516A. doi:10.1103/PhysRevD.59.043516. S2CID 56138144.
- Magueijo, João; Smolin, Lee (2002). "Lorentz Invariance with an Invariant Energy Scale". Physical Review Letters. 88 (19) 190403. arXiv:hep-th/0112090. Bibcode:2002PhRvL..88s0403M. doi:10.1103/PhysRevLett.88.190403. PMID 12005620. S2CID 14468105.
- Magueijo, João (2003). "New varying speed of light theories". Reports on Progress in Physics. 66 (11): 2025–2068. arXiv:astro-ph/0305457. Bibcode:2003RPPh...66.2025M. doi:10.1088/0034-4885/66/11/R04. S2CID 15716718.)
