= Var C =

Var C may refer to:

- Variable c, variable speed of light
- variable declaration of "c" in computer programming
- C variable types and declarations
- M33 Var C, see List of most luminous stars
