= Einstein Wrote Back =

Book by John Moffat

- Hardcover edition
- Author: John W. Moffat
- Language: English
- Subject: Memoir
- Genre: Non-fiction
- Publication date: 2010
- Publication place: Canada
- Pages: 244 pp.
- ISBN: 978-0-88762-615-9
- Preceded by: Reinventing Gravity

Einstein Wrote Back is a memoir by Canadian physicist John Moffat that documents his encounters with various other famous physicists, including Niels Bohr, Albert Einstein, Erwin Schrödinger, Fred Hoyle, Wolfgang Pauli, Paul Dirac, Abdus Salam, and J. Robert Oppenheimer, as well as his work at Imperial College London, Princeton University, CERN, and the University of Toronto. The book's title comes from a series of letters Moffat exchanged with Einstein early in his life, which inspired Moffat to continue studying physics.

== Reception ==
Writing in Physics World, Graham Farmelo described the book as a pleasant read, though some of the anecdotes appeared embellished and historical details were inconsistent.

== See also ==
- Reinventing Gravity, 2008 book by Moffat
- Cracking the Particle Code of the Universe: The Hunt for the Higgs Boson, 2014 book by Moffat
