= Scalar–tensor–vector gravity =

Modified theory of gravity developed by John Moffat

Scalar–tensor–vector gravity (STVG) is a modified theory of gravity developed by John Moffat, a researcher at the Perimeter Institute for Theoretical Physics in Waterloo, Ontario. The theory is also often referred to by the acronym MOG (MOdified Gravity).

== Overview ==
Scalar–tensor–vector gravity theory, also known as MOdified Gravity (MOG), is based on an action principle and postulates the existence of a vector field, while elevating the three constants of the theory to scalar fields. In the weak-field approximation, STVG produces a Yukawa-like modification of the gravitational force due to a point source. Intuitively, this result can be described as follows: far from a source gravity is stronger than the Newtonian prediction, but at shorter distances, it is counteracted by a repulsive fifth force due to the vector field.

STVG has been used successfully to explain galaxy rotation curves, the mass profiles of galaxy clusters, gravitational lensing in the Bullet Cluster, and cosmological observations without the need for dark matter. On a smaller scale, in the Solar System, STVG predicts no observable deviation from general relativity. The theory may also offer an explanation for the origin of inertia.

== Mathematical details ==
STVG is formulated using the action principle. In the following discussion, a metric signature of $[+,-,-,-]$ will be used; the speed of light is set to $c=1$, and we are using the following definition for the Ricci tensor:

$$R_{\alpha\beta}=\partial_\gamma\Gamma^\gamma_{\alpha\beta}-\partial_\beta\Gamma^\gamma_{\alpha\gamma}+\Gamma^\gamma_{\alpha\beta}\Gamma^\delta_{\gamma\delta}-\Gamma^\gamma_{\alpha\delta}\Gamma^\delta_{\gamma\beta}.$$

We begin with the Einstein–Hilbert Lagrangian:

$${\mathcal L}_G=-\frac{1}{16\pi G}(R+2\Lambda)\sqrt{-g},$$

where $R$ is the trace of the Ricci tensor, $G$ is the gravitational constant, $g$ is the determinant of the metric tensor $g_{\alpha\beta}$, while $\Lambda$ is the cosmological constant.

We introduce the Maxwell-Proca Lagrangian for the STVG covector field $\phi_\alpha$:

$$\mathcal{L}_\phi=-\frac{1}{4\pi}\omega\left[\frac{1}{4}B^{\alpha\beta}B_{\alpha\beta}-\frac{1}{2}\mu^2\phi_\alpha\phi^\alpha+V_\phi(\phi)\right]\sqrt{-g},$$

where $B_{\alpha\beta}=\partial_\alpha\phi_\beta-\partial_\beta\phi_\alpha = (\mathrm{d}\phi)_{\alpha\beta}$ is the field strength of $\phi_\alpha$ (given by the exterior derivative), $\mu$ is the mass of the vector field, $\omega$ characterizes the strength of the coupling between the fifth force and matter, and $V_\phi$ is a self-interaction potential.

The three constants of the theory, $G, \mu,$ and $\omega,$ are promoted to scalar fields by introducing associated kinetic and potential terms in the Lagrangian density:

$${\mathcal L}_S=-\frac{1}{G}\left[\frac{1}{2}g^{\alpha\beta}\left(\frac{\partial_\alpha G\partial_\beta G}{G^2}+\frac{\partial_\alpha\mu\partial_\beta\mu}{\mu^2}-\partial_\alpha\omega\partial_\beta\omega\right)+\frac{V_G(G)}{G^2}+\frac{V_\mu(\mu)}{\mu^2}+V_\omega(\omega)\right]\sqrt{-g},$$

where $V_G, V_\mu,$ and $V_\omega$ are the self-interaction potentials associated with the scalar fields.

The STVG action integral takes the form

$$S=\int{({\mathcal L}_G+{\mathcal L}_\phi+{\mathcal L}_S+{\mathcal L}_M)}~\mathrm{d^4} x,$$

where ${\mathcal L}_M$ is the ordinary matter Lagrangian density.

== Spherically symmetric, static vacuum solution ==
The field equations of STVG can be developed from the action integral using the variational principle. First a test particle Lagrangian is postulated in the form

$${\mathcal L}_\mathrm{TP}=-m+\alpha\omega q_5\phi_\mu u^\mu,$$

where $m$ is the test particle mass, $\alpha$ is a factor representing the nonlinearity of the theory, $q_5$ is the test particle's fifth-force charge, and $u^\mu=dx^\mu/ds$ is its four-velocity. Assuming that the fifth-force charge is proportional to mass, i.e., $q_5=\kappa m,$ the value of $\kappa=\sqrt{G_N/\omega}$ is determined and the following equation of motion is obtained in the spherically symmetric, static gravitational field of a point mass of mass $M$:

$$\ddot{r}=-\frac{G_NM}{r^2}\left[1+\alpha-\alpha(1+\mu r)e^{-\mu r}\right],$$

where $G_N$ is Newton's constant of gravitation. Further study of the field equations allows a determination of $\alpha$ and $\mu$ for a point gravitational source of mass $M$ in the form

$$\mu=\frac{D}{\sqrt{M}},$$
$$\alpha=\frac{G_\infty-G_N}{G_N}\frac{M}{(\sqrt{M}+E)^2},$$

where $G_\infty\simeq 20G_N$ is determined from cosmological observations, while for the constants $D$ and $E$ galaxy rotation curves yield the following values:

$$D\simeq 25^2\cdot\,10 M_\odot^{1/2}\mathrm{kpc}^{-1},$$
$$E\simeq 50^2\cdot\,10 M_\odot^{1/2},$$

where $M_\odot$ is the mass of the Sun. These results form the basis of a series of calculations that are used to confront the theory with observation.

== Agreement with observations ==
STVG/MOG has been applied successfully to a range of astronomical, astrophysical, and cosmological phenomena.

On the scale of the Solar System, the theory predicts no deviation from the results of Newton and Einstein. This is also true for star clusters containing no more than a few million solar masses.

The theory accounts for the rotation curves of spiral galaxies, correctly reproducing the Tully–Fisher law.

STVG is in good agreement with the mass profiles of galaxy clusters.

STVG can also account for key cosmological observations, including:

- The acoustic peaks in the cosmic microwave background radiation;
- The accelerating expansion of the universe that is apparent from type Ia supernova observations;
- The matter power spectrum of the universe that is observed in the form of galaxy-galaxy correlations.

== Problems and criticism ==
A 2017 article in Forbes by Ethan Siegel states that the Bullet Cluster still "proves dark matter exists, but not for the reason most physicists think". There he argues in favor of dark matter over non-local gravity theories, such as STVG/MOG. Observations show that in "undisturbed" galaxy clusters the reconstructed mass from gravitational lensing is located where matter is distributed, and a separation of matter from gravitation only seems to appear after a collision or interaction has taken place. According to Ethan Siegel: "Adding dark matter makes this work, but non-local gravity would make differing before-and-after predictions that can't both match up, simultaneously, with what we observe." However, this assessment has been challenged by more recent observations. A 2026 study using James Webb Space Telescope photometry re-examined the baryonic mass budget of the Bullet Cluster's core regions, incorporating stellar remnants (neutron stars and black holes) predicted by the integrated galaxy-wide initial mass function (IGIMF) given the high metallicity of the intracluster gas. The authors found that once this additional baryonic mass is accounted for, the strong-lensing masses required are consistent with MOND-based predictions, without the need for cluster-scale non-baryonic dark matter in the core regions.

== See also ==
- Modified Newtonian dynamics
- Nonsymmetric gravitational theory
- Tensor–vector–scalar gravity
- Reinventing Gravity
