= Reinventing Gravity =

Book by John Moffat

Reinventing Gravity: A Physicist Goes Beyond Einstein
- Author: John W. Moffat
- Language: English
- Genre: Science text
- Publication date: 2008
- Publication place: Canada
- ISBN: 0-06-117088-7

Reinventing Gravity: A Scientist Goes Beyond Einstein is a science text by John W. Moffat, which explains his controversial theory of gravity.

== Moffat's theory ==
Moffat's work culminates in his nonsymmetric gravitational theory and scalar–tensor–vector gravity (now called MOG). His theory explains galactic rotation curves without invoking dark matter. He proposes a variable speed of light approach to cosmological problems, which posits that G/c is constant through time, but G and c separately have not been. Moreover, the speed of light c may have been much higher (at least a trillion trillion times faster than the normal speed of light) during early moments of the Big Bang. His recent work on inhomogeneous cosmological models purports to explain certain anomalous effects in the CMB data, and to account for the recently discovered acceleration of the expansion of the universe.

The theory is based on an action principle and postulates the existence of a vector field, while elevating the three constants of the theory to scalar fields. In the weak-field approximation, STVG produces a Yukawa-like modification of the gravitational force due to a point source. Intuitively, this result can be described as follows: when far from a gravitational source, gravity is stronger than the Newtonian prediction, but at shorter distances, it is counteracted by a repulsive fifth force due to the vector field.

== Reception ==
The book was positively reviewed in EE Times, Physics World and Publishers Weekly.

== See also ==
- Einstein Wrote Back, another book by Moffat
