= C. B. Collins =

Cosmologist

Christopher Barry Collins is a cosmologist who has written many papers with Stephen Hawking. He is a professor emeritus of applied mathematics at the University of Waterloo.

Collins earned his Ph.D. in 1972 from the University of Cambridge under the supervision of F. Gerard Friedlander. Among his works with Hawking is a 1973 paper that uses the anthropic principle to provide a solution to the flatness problem.

== Selected publications ==
- Collins, C. B. (1971), "More qualitative cosmology", Communications in Mathematical Physics, 23 (2): 137–158, Bibcode:1971CMaPh..23..137C, doi:10.1007/bf01877756, S2CID 121299977.
- Collins, C. B.; Hawking, S. W. (1973), "Why is the Universe Isotropic?", Astrophysical Journal, 180: 317–334, Bibcode:1973ApJ...180..317C, doi:10.1086/151965.
- Collins, C. B.; Hawking, S. W.; Sciama, D. W. (1973), "The rotation and distortion of the universe", Monthly Notices of the Royal Astronomical Society, 162 (4): 307–320, Bibcode:1973MNRAS.162..307C, doi:10.1093/mnras/162.4.307.
- Collins, C. B.; Ellis, G. F. R. (1979), "Singularities in Bianchi cosmologies", Physics Reports, 56 (2): 65–105, Bibcode:1979PhR....56...65C, doi:10.1016/0370-1573(79)90065-6.
- Collins, C. B.; Glass, E. N.; Wilkinson, D. A. (1980), "Exact spatially homogeneous cosmologies", General Relativity and Gravitation, 12 (10): 805–823, Bibcode:1980GReGr..12..805C, doi:10.1007/bf00763057, S2CID 123332177.

== See also ==
- List of University of Waterloo people
