= Nonsymmetric gravitational theory =

Concept in physics

In theoretical physics, the nonsymmetric gravitational theory (NGT) of John Moffat is a classical theory of gravitation that tries to explain the observation of the flat rotation curves of galaxies.

In general relativity, the gravitational field is characterized by a symmetric rank-2 tensor, the metric tensor. The possibility of generalizing the metric tensor has been considered by many, including Albert Einstein and others. A general (nonsymmetric) tensor can always be decomposed into a symmetric and an antisymmetric part. As the electromagnetic field is characterized by an antisymmetric rank-2 tensor, there is an obvious possibility for a unified theory: a nonsymmetric tensor composed of a symmetric part representing gravity, and an antisymmetric part that represents electromagnetism. Research in this direction ultimately proved fruitless; the desired classical unified field theory was not found.

In 1979, Moffat made the observation that the antisymmetric part of the generalized metric tensor need not necessarily represent electromagnetism; it may represent a new, hypothetical force. Later, in 1995, Moffat noted that the field corresponding with the antisymmetric part need not be massless, like the electromagnetic (or gravitational) fields.

In its original form, the theory may be unstable, although this has only been shown in the case of the linearized version.

In the weak field approximation where interaction between fields is not taken into account, NGT is characterized by a symmetric rank-2 tensor field (gravity), an antisymmetric tensor field, and a constant characterizing the mass of the antisymmetric tensor field. The antisymmetric tensor field is found to satisfy the equations of a Maxwell–Proca massive antisymmetric tensor field. This led Moffat to propose metric-skew-tensor-gravity (MSTG), in which a skew symmetric tensor field postulated as part of the gravitational action.

A newer version of MSTG, in which the skew symmetric tensor field was replaced by a vector field, is scalar–tensor–vector gravity (STVG). STVG, like Milgrom's Modified Newtonian Dynamics (MOND), can provide an explanation for flat rotation curves of galaxies.

In 2013, Hammond showed the nonsymmetric part of the metric tensor was shown to be equal to the torsion potential, a result following the metricity condition, that the length of a vector is invariant under parallel transport. In addition, the energy momentum tensor is not symmetric, and both the symmetric and nonsymmetric parts are those of a string.

== See also ==
- Reinventing Gravity
