= SN H0pe =

Type Ia supernova in Ursa Major (UMa for short)

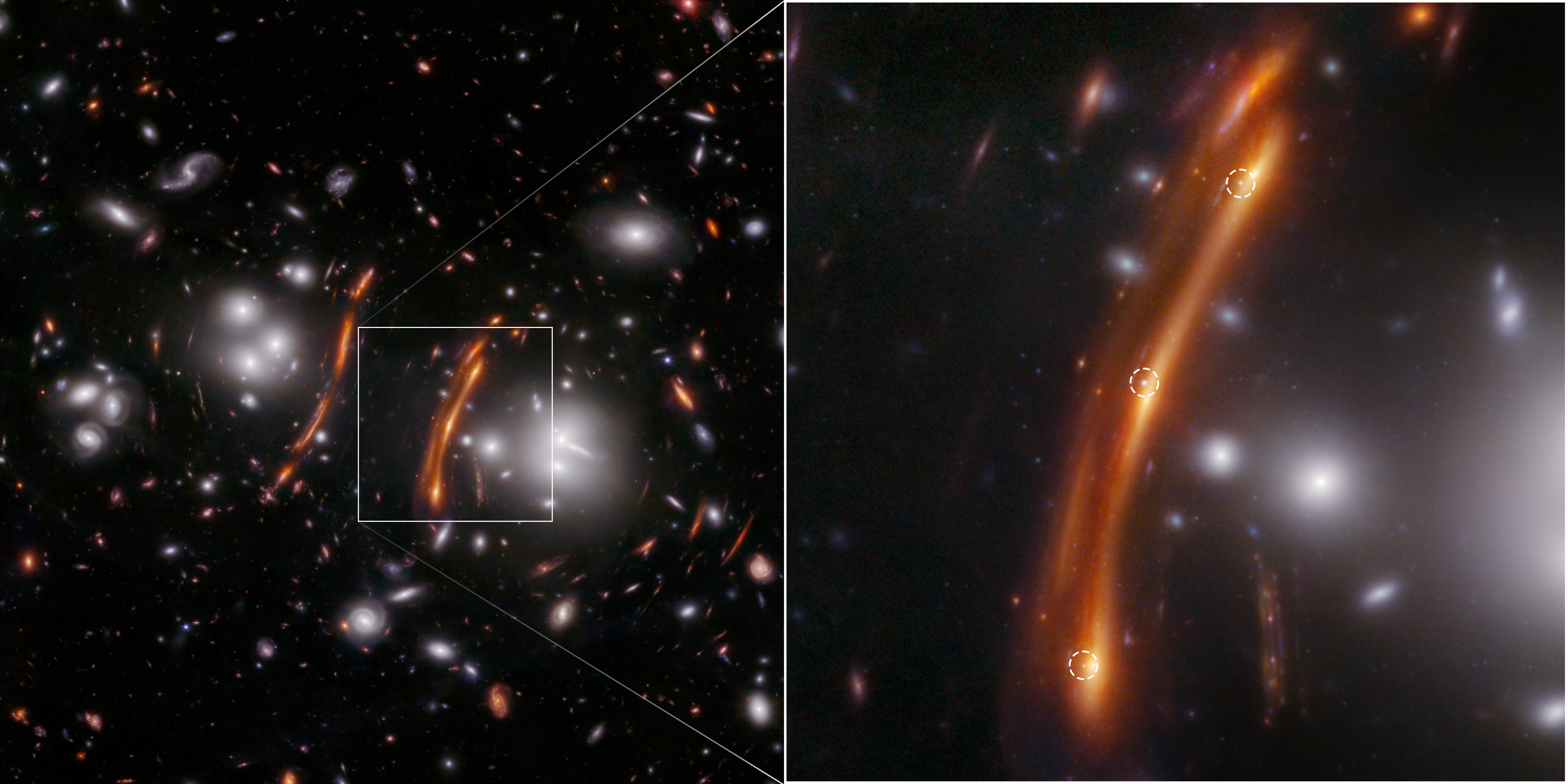
- Supernova H0pe with JWST shown in three circles on the right side. The three images are called image 2a (bottom), 2b (middle) and 2c (top)
- Event type: Supernova
- Type Ia
- Date: 2023-03-30
- Duration: 40 days
- Instrument: James Webb Space Telescope
- Constellation: Ursa Major
- Right ascension: 11^{h} 27^{m} 15.60^{s}
- Declination: +42° 28′ 33.73″
- Epoch: J2000.0
- Galactic coordinates: 165.6224 +67.0069
- Redshift: 1.783
- Host: PLCK G165.7+67.0 Arc 1
- Progenitor type: white dwarf
- Peak apparent magnitude: F150W (image 2b) 23.93 ±0.07 mag
- Other designations: SN H0pe, SN Hope, Supernova Hope, Supernova H0pe, PLCK G165.7+67.0 SN 2023, PLCK G165.7+67.0 Arc 1 SN 2023, G165 SN 2023, G165 Arc 1 SN 2023, Arc 1 SN 2023

SN H0pe (pronounced: Supernova Hope) is a Type Ia supernova discovered in 2023, at a redshift of z=1.78. It is a supernova discovered in a gravitationally lensed subject system, being itself a triply lensed object. Its name, H0pe, comes from its proposed utility in determination of the Hubble Constant (H_{0}) that would allow determination of H0 in the distant universe and compare it with local determinations; and hopefully resolve Hubble tension, the difference in such determinations with local Type Ia supernovae and those based on the very distant Cosmic Microwave Background. The supernova exploded when the universe was 3.5 billion years old, rather than at today's date of 13.8 billion years old. The supernova progenitor was a white dwarf star, the progenitor of all Type Ia supernovae. The gravitational lens is galaxy cluster PLCK G165.7+67.0 (at a redshift of z=0.35), which lensed the supernova and its host galaxy.

Animation showing the disappearance of the supernova.

The determination for the Hubble Constant (H_{0}) using this Type Ia supernova was 75.4 kilometers per second per megaparsec. This greatly agrees with the determination of H_{0} with local Type Ia supernova of 73 kilometers per second per megaparsec. And this is at variance with the determination from the Cosmic Microwave Background and baryon acoustic oscillations, of 67 kilometers per second per megaparsec. Thus not resolving the Hubble tension, but instead reinforcing the difference. This determination of H_{0} from a multiply-lensed Type Ia supernova represents the first such precision measurement.

The supernova is located in the galaxy PLCK G165.7+67.0 Arc 1 (Arc 1 for short) located at redshift z=1.78, behind the lensing cluster PLCK G165.7+67.0 (G165 for short) located at redshift z=0.35, and is triply imaged, each image called Arc 1a, Arc 1b, Arc 1c. This galaxy is part of a compact group of galaxies, of 6 members, 4 of which surround the host galaxy. This group 6 of galaxies is part of 11 galaxies that are imaged by the lens, each referred to as Arc 1, Arc 2, etc. The host galaxy is the dominant galaxy in its compact group. The lens system is located in the constellation of Ursa Major.

The different images of the supernova arrived with a time delay. Images a and b had a time delay of Δt_{ab}=−116.6+10.8
−9.3 observer-frame days. Images c and b had a time delay of Δt_{cb}=−48.6+3.6
−4.0 observer-frame days. Both measurements are relative to the last image to arrive (image 2b), meaning image a arrived around 117 days earlier than image b and image c arrived around 49 days earlier than image b.
