= Thomas Vargish =

American academic (1939–2023)

- Born: February 13, 1939
- Died: September 2023 (aged 84)
- Awards: Guggenheim Fellowship (1972)

Academic background
- Education: Columbia University (BA); Merton College, Oxford (MA); Princeton University (PhD)

Academic work
- Discipline: English literature
- Institutions: Dartmouth College; University of Maryland, Baltimore County; University of Gothenburg; United States Air Force Academy

Thomas Vargish (February 13, 1939 – September 2023) was an American scholar of literature. He was a professor of English at Dartmouth College.

== Life and career ==
Vargish was born in Granville, New York, on February 13, 1939. He received his B.A. from Columbia University in 1960. That year, he won a Rhodes Scholarship to study at Merton College, Oxford, and received his Ph.D. from Princeton University. Vargish's brother, Stephan Vargish, was also a Rhodes Scholar. He taught at Dartmouth College, University of Maryland, Baltimore County, University of Gothenburg, and the United States Air Force Academy.

He earned a Guggenheim Fellowship in 1972 to work on a book on the religious background of Victorian fiction. He has also authored books on relativity and cubism with Dartmouth physicist Delo Mook, father of political strategist Robby Mook.

Vargish died in September 2023, at the age of 84.
