= John Moffat (physicist) =

Canadian physicist

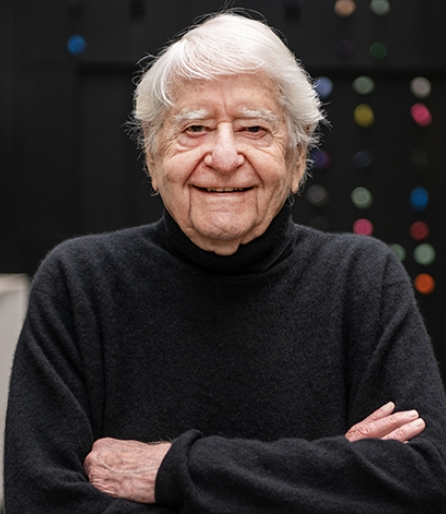
- Moffat in 2025
- Born: 24 May 1932 (age 94); Copenhagen, Denmark
- Education: Trinity College, Cambridge
- Known for: Gravitation; Quantum field theory Variable speed of light
- Scientific career
- Fields: Physics
- Workplaces: University of Toronto; Perimeter Institute for Theoretical Physics, Waterloo
- Doctoral advisor: Fred Hoyle and Abdus Salam

John W. Moffat (born 24 May 1932) is a Danish-born Canadian physicist. He is currently professor emeritus of physics at the University of Toronto and is also an adjunct professor of physics at the University of Waterloo and a resident affiliate member of the Perimeter Institute for Theoretical Physics.

Moffat is best known for his work on gravity and cosmology, culminating in his nonsymmetric gravitational theory and scalar–tensor–vector gravity (now called MOG), and summarized in his 2008 book for general readers, Reinventing Gravity. His theory explains galactic rotation curves without invoking dark matter. He proposes a variable speed of light approach to cosmological problems. The speed of light c may have been more than 15 orders of magnitude higher during the early moments of the Big Bang. His recent work on inhomogeneous cosmological models purports to explain certain anomalous effects in the CMB data, and to account for the recently discovered acceleration of the expansion of the universe.

Moffat has proposed a new nonlocal variant of quantum field theory, that is finite at all orders and hence dispenses with renormalization. It also generates mass without a Higgs mechanism.

== Early life and education ==
Kawarthas Landscape by John Moffat

Moffat was born in Copenhagen, Denmark, the son of a Scottish father, George Moffat, and Danish mother, Esther (née Winther). His father, a musician from Glasgow, was performing in a night club in Copenhagen when he met Esther, a dancer. They married three weeks later.

In 1938, on the eve of the Second World War, John's father moved the family to London, correctly predicting that Denmark would be invaded by Germany. In later 1939, during the Blitz, the 7-year-old John was evacuated to Glasgow to live with his grandparents. But he failed to thrive in Glasgow, struggling academically, so after a year he returned to his parents, and all three moved to Bristol, where his father got a job searching ships for German spies.

In Bristol, they lived close to the factory that manufactured the Bristol F.2 Fighters. Air raids were frequent as the Battle of Britain intensified in 1940. One day, they went to the boardwalk at Weston-super-Mare to escape the raids in Bristol, only to have German planes appear overhead. As Moffat recalled in his memoir, Einstein Wrote Back:

"I heard the shriek of the whistling bombs as they fell, and then the hollow booms as they detonated deep inside the mud of the beach... The blast blew my parents and me across the road adjacent to the boardwalk. I landed in a garden on my back, opened my eyes and stared at the blue sky, and there was a loud ringing in my ears. The blood was pouring out of my nose, and I felt a terrible tightness and pain in my chest... In a daze, I got up, and soon discovered my parents in the same garden, on all fours, attempting to stand up, also suffering from nosebleeds and chest pains."

The trauma from the bombing and the air-raids stayed with him for a lifetime, Moffat wrote:

"At the time, I was somehow able to suppress the horror of our experiences during the war, and carry on day by day. However, about a year after the bombings in Bristol and Weston-super-Mare, I began suffering from what is now called post-traumatic stress disorder. I began getting severe nightmares and panic attacks. Even today I still occasionally experience panic attacks, generally when I am visiting Europe."

When John was 7 or 8, his father took him to a psychiatrist in London because he insisted on reading sentences and clocks backward. The psychiatrist told his father that he was a genius. John, overhearing, did not think the word meant much for his future.

After the war, the family moved back to Denmark, where John's father started an import-export business. He contracted tuberculosis from one of his employees and became seriously ill for a year, and the family struggled to get by.

=== Interest in physics ===
As a teenager, Moffat quit school at 16 to become an artist. He gave up after living for a time in Paris with no income. Upon returning to Copenhagen, he became interested in the cosmos and began teaching himself mathematics and physics. The University of Copenhagen allowed anyone to check out books from its libraries, and he made such quick progress that within a year he began working on problems of general relativity and unified field theory.

When Moffat was about 20 years old, he wrote a letter to Albert Einstein, informing the great physicist that he was working on one of his theories. "Dear Professor . . . I would be eternally indebted if you could find time to read my work," he began.

"In 1953 Einstein sent me a reply, from Princeton, New Jersey, but it was written in German. So I ran down to my barber shop (in Copenhagen) to have my barber translate it for me. Through that summer and fall, we exchanged about a half dozen letters. The local press picked up on these stories which then caught the attention of physicist Niels Bohr and others. Suddenly doors of opportunity were swinging open for me". (Perimeter Institute for Theoretical Physics, 2005)

Einstein's initial reply:

"Most honorable Mr. Moffat: Our situation is the following. We are standing in front of a closed box which we cannot open, and we try hard to discuss what is inside and what is not," Einstein replied.

Moffat's correspondence with Einstein and meeting with Bohr drew the attention of officials at the British consulate in Copenhagen, and he was invited to study at Cambridge. In 1958, he was awarded a PhD without a first degree at Trinity College, Cambridge. He was supervised by Fred Hoyle and Abdus Salam.

== Variable speed of light: theory and controversy ==
In 1992, John Moffat proposed that the speed of light was much larger in the early universe, in which the speed of light had a value of more than 10^{30} km/s. He published his "variable speed of light" (VSL) theory in two places—on the Los Alamos National Laboratory's (LANL) online archive, 16 Nov. 1992, and in a 1993 edition of International Journal of Modern Physics D.

The scientific community mostly ignored VSL theory until in 2001, University of New South Wales astronomer John Webb and peers detected experimental evidence from telescopic observations that the cosmological fine-structure constant—which contains the speed of light—may have been different than its present value in the very early Universe.

The observations supported Moffat's VSL theory—and started a race for primacy that began in 1998.

That year, five years after Moffat had published his VSL papers, João Magueijo of Imperial College in London, and collaborators Andreas Albrecht of the University of California at Davis and John D. Barrow of Cambridge University, published a strikingly similar idea in the more prestigious journal, Physical Review D, which had rejected Moffat's paper years earlier.

Informed of the omission, Magueijo credited Moffat with an entire chapter in Magueijo's 2002 book, Faster Than the Speed of Light: The story of a scientific speculation.

The controversy reignited, however, when during a worldwide publicity tour for Magueijo's book, the author neither credited Moffat nor corrected numerous erroneous press accounts—in such magazines as Discover, Publishers Weekly, Seed Magazine and the Christian Science Monitor. In efforts to portray Magueijo as a "brash, young scientific upstart," dozens of publications attributed VSL theory entirely to Magueijo and his co-authors, leaving Moffat—in his late sixties by this time—out. Moffat expressed displeasure about the re-emergent omissions, urging reporters to check their facts, but to no avail.

Stories emerged about the book tour media omissions in March and July 2003, written by a science journalist, Michael Martin, who had earlier attributed VSL theory to Moffat in a 2001 UPI article about Webb's astronomical discoveries. Discover Magazine writer Tim Folger acknowledged the omissions in his story and apologized. In response to a reader letter from Henry van Driel of the University of Toronto Department of Physics, Folger wrote, "Professor van Driel is absolutely right—John Moffat did develop a varying speed of light theory several years before João Magueijo, and I regret not including that information in my story."

Months later, as other reports picked up on the reignited dispute, Magueijo reiterated Moffat's primacy in VSL theory. In September 2004, Discover Magazine's Tim Folger followed through on a promise he had made during the controversy to "write a story about John Moffat."

The two physicists became friends, publishing a joint paper in 2007 in the journal General Relativity and Gravitation.

== Modified gravity theory ==
Continuing Einstein's search for a unified field theory, Moffat proposed a nonsymmetric gravitational theory that, like Einstein's unified field, incorporated a symmetric field (gravity) and an antisymmetric field. Unlike Einstein, however, Moffat made no attempt to identify the latter with electromagnetism, instead proposing that the antisymmetric component is another manifestation of gravity. As investigation progressed, the theory evolved in a variety of ways; most notably, Moffat postulated that the antisymmetric field may be massive.

The current version of his modified gravity (MOG) theory, which grew out of this investigation, modifies Einstein's gravity with the addition of a vector field, while also promoting the constants of the theory to scalar fields. The combined effect of these fields modifies the strength of gravity at large distances when large masses are involved, successfully accounting for a range of astronomical and cosmological observations. According to Moffat the resulting theory describes well, without invoking dark matter, the rotation curves of galaxies and the mass profiles of X-ray galaxy clusters.

== Non-local quantum field theory ==
In 1990, Moffat proposed a finite, non-local quantum field theory. The theory was developed extensively by Evens, Moffat, Kleppe and Woodard in 1991. In subsequent work, Moffat proposed this theory as an alternative to the standard electroweak unification of electromagnetism and the weak nuclear interactions. Moffat's theory is a quantum field theory with a non-local term in the field Lagrangian. The theory is gauge invariant and it is finite to all orders of perturbation theory. According to Moffat, for the Standard Model it can solve the Higgs boson mass hierarchy naturalness problem, and leads to a finite quantum gravity theory.

== Publications ==
=== Books ===
- Reinventing Gravity. HarperCollins. 2008. ISBN 978-0-06-117088-1.
- Einstein Wrote Back. Thomas Allen Publishers. 2010. ISBN 978-0-88762-615-9.
- Cracking the Particle Code of the Universe: The Hunt for the Higgs Boson. Oxford University Press. 2014. ISBN 978-0-19-991552-1.

=== Selected articles ===
- (1990) "Finite nonlocal gauge field theory," Phys. Rev. D 41: 1177–1184.
- (1993) "Superluminary Universe: A Possible Solution to the Initial Value Problem in Cosmology," Int. Jour. Mod. Phys. D2: 351–366.
- (1995) "Nonsymmetric Gravitational Theory," Phys. Lett. B 355: 447–452.
- (2006) "Scalar-Tensor-Vector Gravity Theory," JCAP 0603: 004.

== See also ==
- List of University of Waterloo people
- Nonsymmetric gravitational theory
- Variable speed of light
- Scalar–tensor–vector gravity
