= Variable speed of light =

Non-mainstream theory in physics

A variable speed of light (VSL) is a feature of a family of hypotheses stating that the speed of light may in some way not be constant, for example, that it varies with frequency, in space, or over time. Accepted classical theories of physics, and in particular general relativity, predict a constant speed of light in any local frame of reference and in some situations these predict apparent variations of the speed of light depending on frame of reference, but this article does not refer to this as a variable speed of light. Various alternative theories of gravitation and cosmology, many of them non-mainstream, incorporate variations in the local speed of light.

Attempts to incorporate a variable speed of light into physics were made by Robert Dicke in 1957, and by several researchers starting from the late 1980s.

VSL should not be confused with faster than light theories, which depends on a medium's refractive index or its measurement in a remote observer's frame of reference in a gravitational potential. In this context, the "speed of light" refers to the limiting speed c of the theory rather than to the velocity of propagation of photons.

== Historical proposals ==
=== Background ===
While the speed of light is generally considered to be a constant, the idea that physical "constants" might be variable has a long history. One of early proposals was the Dirac large numbers hypothesis. Looking for variation in these constants is an important way of testing the physical laws.

Einstein's equivalence principle, on which general relativity is founded, requires that in any local, freely falling reference frame, the speed of light is always the same. This leaves open the possibility, however, that an inertial observer inferring the apparent speed of light in a distant region might calculate a different value. Spatial variation of the speed of light in a gravitational potential as measured against a distant observer's time reference is implicitly present in general relativity. The apparent speed of light will change in a gravity field and, in particular, go to zero at an event horizon as viewed by a distant observer. In deriving the gravitational redshift due to a spherically symmetric massive body, a radial speed of light dr/dt can be defined in Schwarzschild coordinates, with t being the time recorded on a stationary clock at infinity. The result is

$$\frac{dr}{dt} = 1 - \frac{2m}{r},$$

where m is MG/c^{2} and where natural units are used such that c_{0} is equal to one.

=== Dicke's proposal (1957) ===
Robert Dicke, in 1957, developed a VSL theory of gravity, a theory in which (unlike general relativity) the speed of light measured locally by a free-falling observer could vary. Dicke assumed that both frequencies and wavelengths could vary, which since $c = \nu \lambda$ resulted in a relative change of c. Dicke assumed a refractive index $n= \frac{c}{c_0} = 1+\frac{2 GM}{r c^2}$ (eqn. 5) and proved it to be consistent with the observed value for light deflection. In a comment related to Mach's principle, Dicke suggested that, while the right part of the term in eq. 5 is small, the left part, 1, could have "its origin in the remainder of the matter in the universe".

Given that in a universe with an increasing horizon more and more masses contribute to the above refractive index, Dicke considered a cosmology where c decreased in time, providing an alternative explanation to the cosmological redshift.

=== Subsequent proposals ===
Several hypotheses for varying speed of light, seemingly in contradiction to general relativity theory, have been published, including those of Giere and Tan (1986) and Sanejouand (2009). In 2003, Magueijo gave a review of such hypotheses.

Cosmological models with varying speeds of light have been proposed independently by Jean-Pierre Petit in 1988, John Moffat in 1992, and the team of Andreas Albrecht and João Magueijo in 1998 to explain the horizon problem of cosmology and propose an alternative to cosmic inflation.

== Relation to other constants and their variation ==
=== Dimensionless and dimensionful quantities ===
Units are vital for experimental measurements and comparing the results of experiments to theory necessarily entangles units and the physical constants. Physical constants with units are not fundamental. Any equation of physical law can be expressed in a form in which all dimensional quantities are normalized against like-dimensioned quantities (called nondimensionalization), resulting in only dimensionless quantities remaining. Only variation of these dimensionless quantities change the nature of physics. A physical theory that postulates a varying fine-structure constant can be expressed as either a variable speed of light or a variable electric charge.

Physicists often adopt natural units in which the physical constants c, G, ħ = h/(2π), 4πε_{0}, and k_{B} take the value one, resulting in every physical quantity being normalized against its corresponding Planck unit. When Planck units are used and such equations of physical law are expressed in this nondimensionalized form, no dimensional physical constants such as c, G, ħ, ε_{0}, nor k_{B} remain, only dimensionless quantities, as predicted by the Buckingham π theorem.

=== Gravitational constant G ===
In 1937, Paul Dirac and others began investigating the consequences of natural constants changing with time. For example, Dirac proposed a change of only 5 parts in 10^{11} per year of the Newtonian constant of gravitation G to explain the relative weakness of the gravitational force compared to other fundamental forces. This has become known as the Dirac large numbers hypothesis.

However, Richard Feynman showed that the gravitational constant most likely could not have changed this much in the past 4 billion years based on geological and solar system observations, although this may depend on assumptions about G varying in isolation. (See also strong equivalence principle.)

=== Fine-structure constant α ===
One group, studying distant quasars, has claimed to detect a variation of the fine-structure constant at the level in one part in 10^{5}. Other authors dispute these results. Other groups studying quasars claim no detectable variation at much higher sensitivities.

The natural nuclear reactor of Oklo has been used to check whether the atomic fine-structure constant α might have changed over the past 2 billion years. That is because α influences the rate of various nuclear reactions. For example, ^{149}Sm captures a neutron to become ^{150}Sm, and since the rate of neutron capture depends on the value of α, the ratio of the two samarium isotopes in samples from Oklo can be used to calculate the value of α from 2 billion years ago. Several studies have analysed the relative concentrations of radioactive isotopes left behind at Oklo, and most have concluded that nuclear reactions then were much the same as they are today, which implies α was the same too.

Paul Davies and collaborators have suggested that it is in principle possible to disentangle which of the dimensionful constants (the elementary charge, the Planck constant, and the speed of light) of which the fine-structure constant is composed is responsible for the variation. However, this has been disputed by others and is not generally accepted.

== Criticisms of various VSL concepts ==
From a very general point of view, G. F. R. Ellis and Jean-Philippe Uzan expressed concerns that a varying c would require a rewrite of much of modern physics to replace the current system which depends on a constant c. The value acts as the velocity of electromagnetic waves; it connects space and time in spacetime, it determines the propagation speed of gravitational waves in vacuum, and it appears in Einstein's equation relating stress-energy to gravity. If a variable speed postulated for any of these uses, every other use must be reevaluated. Such reevaluation must return to the fundamental derivations which rely on assuming a constant c. Ellis claimed that any varying c theory (1) cannot rely on radar-based distance measurements; (2) must provide an alternative expression for the metric tensor in general relativity; (3) might contradict Lorentz invariance; (4) must modify Maxwell's equations; and (5) must be done consistently with respect to all other physical theories. VSL cosmologies remain out of mainstream physics because the possibility that these theories alter fundamental physics.
