= Horizon problem =

Cosmological fine-tuning problem

When we look at the CMB, it comes from 46 billion comoving light-years away. When the light was emitted, the universe was much younger – only 300,000 years old. Physical causes, starting at the earliest time and traveling at the speed of light, would have only reached as far as the smaller circles. The two points indicated on the diagram would not have been able to contact each other because their spheres of causality do not overlap.

The horizon problem, also known as the homogeneity problem, is a cosmological fine-tuning problem within the Big Bang model of the universe. Observations of widely separated regions of space appear homogeneous, yet normal physical processes that create homogeneity require a causal connection and these regions are too far apart. Given the Einsteinian speed limit on communication, they have not had sufficient time to interact with each other since the Big Bang. This creates a difficulty in explaining the observed homogeneity without a mechanism that sets the same initial conditions everywhere. It was first pointed out by Wolfgang Rindler in 1956.

The most commonly accepted hypothesis to explain the horizon problem is cosmic inflation. Alternative solutions propose a cyclic universe or a variable speed of light.

== Background ==
=== Astronomical distances and particle horizons ===
The distances of observable objects in the night sky correspond to times in the past. We use the light-year (the distance light can travel in the time of one Earth year) to describe these cosmological distances. A galaxy measured at ten billion light-years away appears to us as it was ten billion years ago, because the light has taken that long to travel to the observer. If one were to look at a galaxy ten billion light-years away in one direction and another in the opposite direction, the total distance between them is twenty billion light-years. This means that the light from the first has not yet reached the second because the universe is only about 13.8 billion years old. In a more general sense, there are portions of the universe that are visible to us, but invisible to each other, outside each other's respective particle horizons.

=== Causal information propagation ===
In accepted relativistic physical theories, no information can travel faster than the speed of light. In this context, "information" means "any sort of physical interaction". For instance, heat will naturally flow from a hotter area to a cooler one, and in physics terms, this is one example of information exchange. Given the example above, the two galaxies in question cannot have shared any sort of information; they are not in causal contact. In the absence of common initial conditions, one would expect, then, that their physical properties would be different, and more generally, that the universe as a whole would have varying properties in causally disconnected regions.

=== Horizon problem ===
Contrary to this expectation, the observations of the cosmic microwave background (CMB) and galaxy surveys show that the observable universe is nearly isotropic, which, through the Copernican principle, also implies homogeneity. CMB sky surveys show that the temperatures of the CMB are coordinated to a level of $\Delta T/T \approx 10^{-5},$ where $\Delta T$ is the difference between the observed temperature in a region of the sky and the average temperature of the sky $T$. This coordination implies that the entire sky, and thus the entire observable universe, must have been causally connected long enough for the universe to come into thermal equilibrium.

According to the Big Bang model, as the density of the expanding universe dropped, it eventually reached a temperature where photons fell out of thermal equilibrium with matter; they decoupled from the electron-proton plasma and began free-streaming across the universe. This moment in time is referred to as the epoch of Recombination, when electrons and protons became bound to form electrically neutral hydrogen; without free electrons to scatter the photons, the photons began free-streaming. This epoch is observed through the CMB. Since we observe the CMB as a background to objects at a smaller redshift, we describe this epoch as the transition of the universe from opaque to transparent. The CMB physically describes the 'surface of last scattering' as it appears to us as a surface, or a background, as shown in the figure below.

Note we use conformal time in the following diagrams. Conformal time describes the amount of time it would take a photon to travel from the location of the observer to the farthest observable distance (if the universe stopped expanding right now).

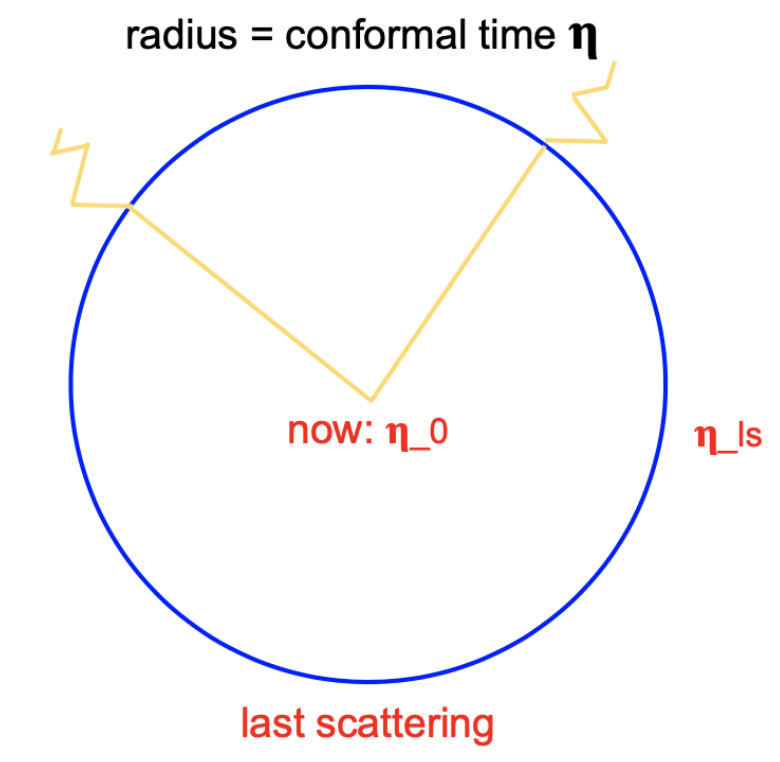
The blue circle is the CMB surface which we observe at the time of last scattering. The yellow lines describe how photons were scattered before the epoch of recombination and were free-streaming after. The observer sits at the center at present time. For reference.

The decoupling, or the last scattering, is thought to have occurred about 300,000 years after the Big Bang, or at a redshift of about $z_{rec} \approx 1100$. We can determine both the approximate angular diameter of the universe and the physical size of the particle horizon that had existed at this time.

The angular diameter distance, in terms of redshift $z$, is described by $d_{A}(z)=r(z) / (1+z)$. If we assume a flat cosmology then,

$$r(z) = \int_{t_{em}}^{t_0} \frac{dt}{a(t)}
= \int_{a_{em}}^{1} \frac{da}{a^2 H(a)} = \int_{0}^{z} \frac{dz}{H(z)}.$$

The epoch of recombination occurred during a matter dominated era of the universe, so we can approximate $H(z)$ as $H^2(z) \approx \Omega_m H_0^2 (1+z)^3$. Putting these together, we see that the angular diameter distance, or the size of the observable universe for a redshift $z_{rec} \approx 1100$ is

$$r(z)=\int_{0}^{z} \frac{dz}{H(z)} = \frac{1}{\sqrt{\Omega_m} H_0}
\int_{0}^{z} \frac{dz}{(1+z)^{3/2}} =
\frac{2}{\sqrt{\Omega_m} H_0}\left(1-\frac{1}{\sqrt{1+z}}\right).$$

Since $z \gg 1$, we can approximate the above equation as

$$r(z) \approx \frac{2}{\sqrt{\Omega_m}H_0}.$$

Substituting this into our definition of angular diameter distance, we obtain

$$d_A(z) \approx \frac{2}{\sqrt{\Omega_m}H_0}\frac{1}{1+z}.$$

From this formula, we obtain the angular diameter distance of the cosmic microwave background as $d_A(1100) \approx 14\ \mathrm{Mpc}$.

The particle horizon describes the maximum distance light particles could have traveled to the observer given the age of the universe. We can determine the comoving distance for the age of the universe at the time of recombination using $r(z)$ from earlier,

$$d_\text{hor,rec}(z)=\int_{0}^{t(z)} \frac{dt}{a(t)}= \int_{z}^{\infin} \frac{dz}{H(z)}
\approx \frac{2}{\sqrt{\Omega_m}H_0}\left [ \frac{1}{\sqrt{1+z}} \right ]_z^\infin
\approx \frac{2}{\sqrt{\Omega_m}H_0}\frac{1}{\sqrt{1+z}}$$

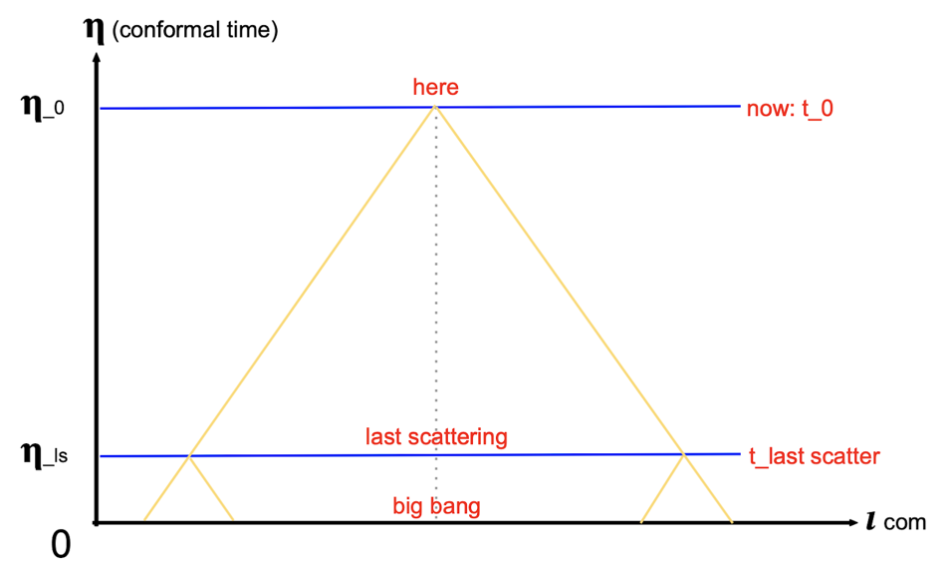
This spacetime diagram shows how the light cones for two light particles spaced some distance apart at the time of last scattering (ls) do not intersect (i.e. they are causally disconnected). The horizontal axis is comoving distance, the vertical axis is conformal time, and the units have the speed of light as 1. For reference.

To get the physical size of the particle horizon $D$,

$$D(z)=a(z)d_\text{hor,rec}= \frac{d_\text{hor,rec}(z)}{1+z}$$
$$D(1100) \approx 0.03~\text{radians} \approx 2^\circ$$

We would expect any region of the CMB within 2 degrees of angular separation to have been in causal contact, but at any scale larger than 2° there should have been no exchange of information.

CMB regions that are separated by more than 2° lie outside one another's particle horizons and are causally disconnected. The horizon problem describes the fact that we see isotropy in the CMB temperature across the entire sky, despite the entire sky not being in causal contact to establish thermal equilibrium. Refer to the timespace diagram to the right for a visualization of this problem.

If the universe started with even slightly different temperatures in different places, the CMB should not be isotropic unless there is a mechanism that evens out the temperature by the time of decoupling. In reality, the CMB has the same temperature in the entire sky, 2.726 ± 0.001 K.

== Inflationary model ==
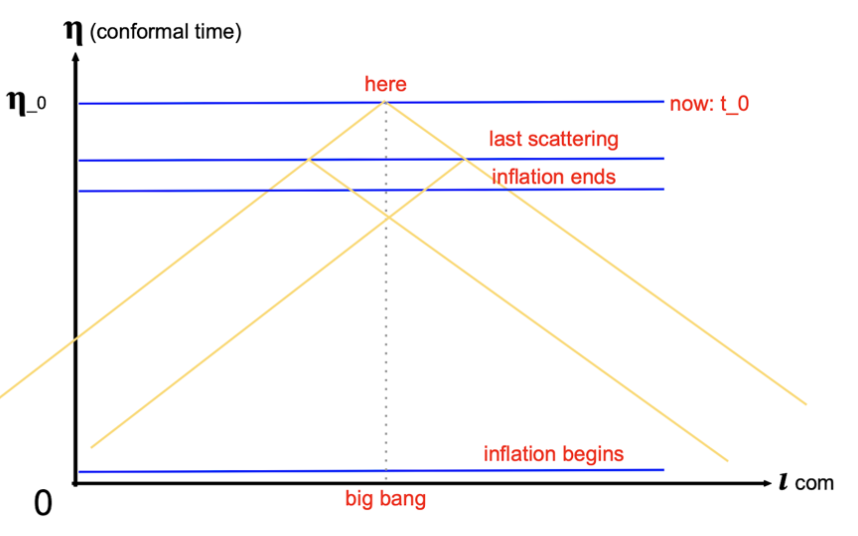
This spacetime diagram shows how inflation changes the light cones for two light particles spaced some distance apart at the time of last scattering (ls) to allow them to intersect. In this scenario, they are in causal contact and can exchange information with one another. The horizontal axis is comoving distance, the vertical axis is conformal time, and the units have the speed of light as 1. For reference.

The theory of cosmic inflation has attempted to address the problem by positing a 10^{−32}-second period of exponential expansion in the first second of the history of the universe due to a scalar field interaction. According to the inflationary model, the universe increased in size by a factor of more than 10^{22}, from a small and causally connected region in near equilibrium. Inflation then expanded the universe rapidly, isolating nearby regions of spacetime by growing them beyond the limits of causal contact, effectively "locking in" the uniformity at large distances. Essentially, the inflationary model suggests that the universe was entirely in causal contact in the very early universe. Inflation then expands this universe by approximately 60 e-foldings (the scale factor increases by factor $e^{60}$). We observe the CMB after inflation has occurred at a very large scale. It maintained thermal equilibrium to this large size because of the rapid expansion from inflation.

One consequence of cosmic inflation is that the anisotropies in the Big Bang due to quantum fluctuations are reduced but not eliminated. Differences in the temperature of the cosmic background are smoothed by cosmic inflation, but they still exist. The theory predicts a spectrum for the anisotropies in the microwave background which is mostly consistent with observations from WMAP and COBE.

== Variable-speed-of-light theories ==
Cosmological models employing a variable speed of light have been proposed to resolve the horizon problem of and provide an alternative to cosmic inflation. In the VSL models, the fundamental constant c, denoting the speed of light in vacuum, is greater in the early universe than its present value, effectively increasing the particle horizon at the time of decoupling sufficiently to account for the observed isotropy of the CMB.

== See also ==
- Flatness problem
- Magnetic monopole
