= Wouthuysen–Field coupling =

Wouthuysen–Field coupling, or the Wouthuysen–Field effect, is a mechanism that couples the excitation temperature, also called the spin temperature, of neutral hydrogen to Lyman-alpha radiation. This coupling plays a role in producing a difference in the temperature of neutral hydrogen and the cosmic microwave background at the end of the Dark Ages and the beginning of the epoch of reionization. It is named for Siegfried Adolf Wouthuysen and George B. Field.

== Background ==
The period after recombination occurred and before stars and galaxies formed is known as the "dark ages". During this time, the majority of matter in the universe is neutral hydrogen. This hydrogen has yet to be observed, but there are experiments underway to detect the hydrogen line produced during this era. The hydrogen line is produced when an electron in a neutral hydrogen atom is excited to the triplet spin state, or de-excited as the electron and proton spins go to the singlet state. The energy difference between these two hyperfine states is $5.9 \times 10^{-6}$ electron volts, with a wavelength of 21 centimeters. At times when neutral hydrogen is in thermodynamic equilibrium with the photons in the cosmic microwave background (CMB), the neutral hydrogen and CMB are said to be "coupled", and the hydrogen line is not observable. It is only when the two temperatures differ, i.e. are decoupled, that the hydrogen line can be observed.

== Coupling mechanism ==
Wouthuysen–Field coupling is a mechanism that couples the spin temperature of neutral hydrogen to Lyman-alpha radiation, which decouples the neutral hydrogen from the CMB. The energy of the Lyman-alpha transition is 10.2 eV—this energy is approximately two million times greater than the hydrogen line, and is produced by astrophysical sources such as stars and quasars. Neutral hydrogen absorbs Lyman-alpha photons, and then re-emits Lyman-alpha photons, and may enter either of the two spin states. This process causes a redistribution of the electrons between the hyperfine states, decoupling the neutral hydrogen from the CMB photons.

The coupling between Lyman-alpha photons and the hyperfine states depends not on the intensity of the Lyman-alpha radiation, but on the shape of the spectrum in the vicinity of the Lyman-alpha transition. That this mechanism might affect the population of the hyperfine states in neutral hydrogen was first suggested in 1952 by S. A. Wouthuysen, and then further developed by George B. Field in 1959.

The effect of Lyman-alpha photons on the hyperfine levels depends upon the relative intensities of the red and blue wings of the Lyman-alpha line, reflecting the very small difference in energy of the hyperfine states relative to the Lyman-alpha transition. At a cosmological redshift of $z \sim 6$, Wouthuysen–Field coupling is expected to raise the spin temperature of neutral hydrogen above that of the CMB, and produce emission in the hydrogen line.

== Observational prospects ==
A hydrogen line signal produced by Wouthuysen–Field coupling has not yet been observed. There are multiple experiments and radio observatories that aim to detect the neutral hydrogen line the Dark Ages and epoch of reionization, the time at which Wouthuysen–Field coupling is expected to be important. These include the Giant Metrewave Radio Telescope, the Precision Array for Probing the Epoch of Reionization, the Murchison Widefield Array, and the Large Aperture Experiment to Detect the Dark Ages. Proposed observatories that aim to detect evidence of Wouthuysen–Field coupling include the Square Kilometer Array and the Dark Ages Radio Explorer.

== See also ==
- Decoupling (cosmology)
