= George B. Field =

American astrophysicist

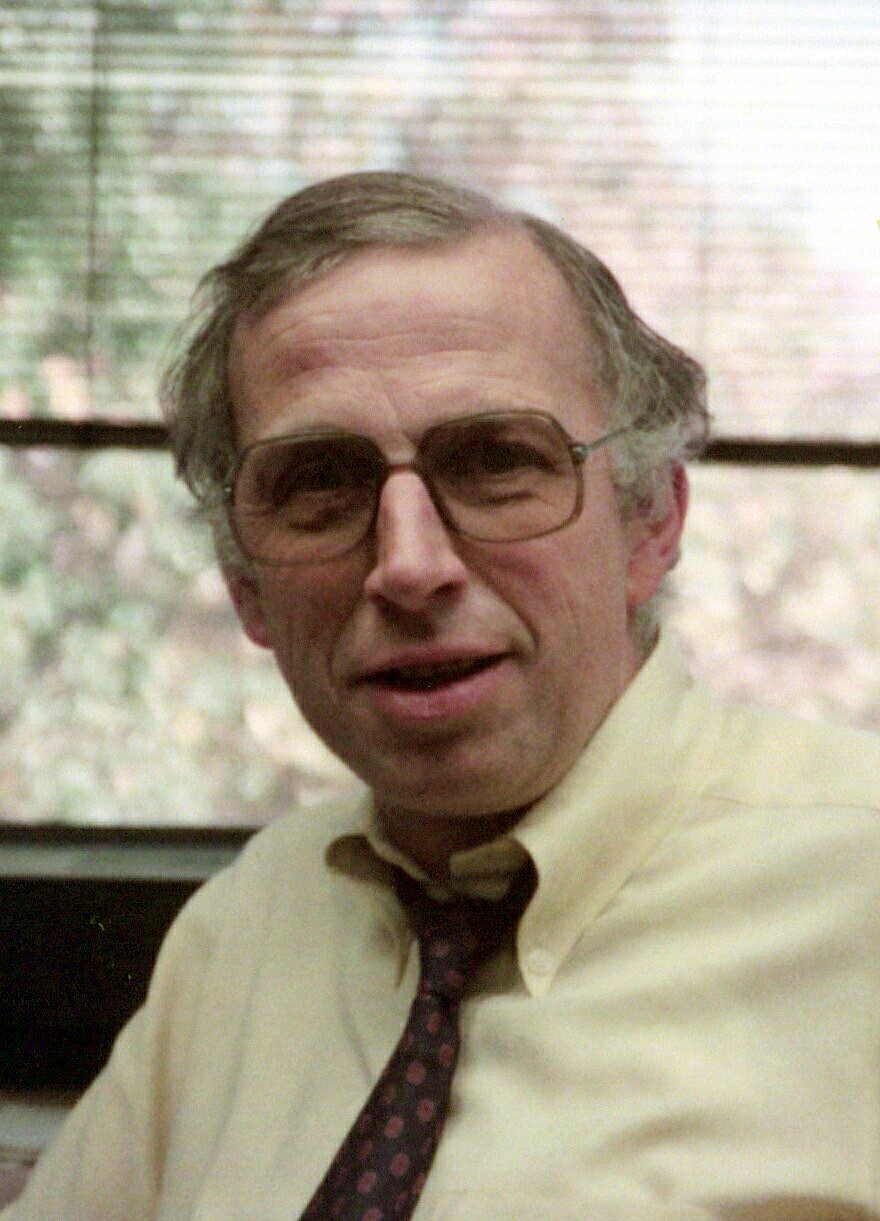
- George B. Field in 1987
- Born: October 25, 1929; Providence, Rhode Island, U.S.
- Died: July 31, 2024 (aged 94); Cambridge, Massachusetts, U.S.
- Education: MIT (B.S., Physics); Princeton University (Ph.D.)
- Known for: Theory of the multiphase Interstellar Medium; Wouthuysen–Field coupling
- Scientific career
- Fields: Astrophysics
- Workplaces: Princeton University; University of California, Berkeley;
- Doctoral advisor: Lyman Spitzer
- Doctoral students: Eric G. Blackman; Sean M. Carroll; Carl E. Heiles; Richard Conn Henry; Christopher McKee; Péter Mészáros; Paul R. Shapiro

George B. Field (October 25, 1929 – July 31, 2024) was an American astrophysicist, Harvard University professor and founder director of the Harvard–Smithsonian Center for Astrophysics. The Wouthuysen–Field coupling, an important mechanism for understanding the characteristics of the 21-cm hydrogen line in the presence of Lyman-alpha radiation, is named after him.

== Early life, family and education ==
Field was born in Providence, Rhode Island. His father Winthrop Brooks Field and mother Pauline Woodworth Field were Harvard and Radcliffe graduates, respectively. He was interested in astronomy at an early age, but at the urging of his father he studied chemical engineering at the Massachusetts Institute of Technology. Disliking engineering, he later switched to physics and astrophysics. After MIT, he attended graduate school at Princeton University, where his PhD advisor was Lyman Spitzer.

At Princeton he had his first child, Christopher Field in 1957. Four years later, he had a daughter, Natasha Field, both with former wife Sylvia Field. From 1981 onward he was married to Susan Field.

== Career ==
He first worked on plasma oscillations and took a postdoctoral position at Harvard with Edward Mills Purcell. His interests evolved toward cosmology and the physics of the interstellar medium of galaxies. He was briefly on the faculty at Princeton before joining the faculty of the Department of Astronomy at the University of California, Berkeley where he remained until 1973. He left to become the founding director of the Center for Astrophysics (CfA) | Harvard & Smithsonian, an organizational structure that unified the Smithsonian Astrophysical Observatory (a government agency) and the Harvard College Observatory (a private institution) under a single management. Field served as Director until 1982, after which he remained the Robert Wheeler Wilson Professor of Applied Astronomy at Harvard until retirement. He was succeeded in the CfA Directorship by Irwin I. Shapiro.

In the early 1980s, Field chaired an influential National Academy of Sciences decadal study that recommended priorities for US astronomical research. It was the third of what has become an extended series of Astronomy and Astrophysics Decadal Surveys, with format and goals now emulated by similar surveys in other disciplines.

After his incumbency as CfA Director, his research focused on the theory of accretion disks in active galactic nuclei; cosmic birefringence; magnetohydrodynamics and magnetic fields in astronomy; and the structure of molecular clouds.

== Doctoral students ==
Among his doctoral student mentees were: Eric G. Blackman, Sean M. Carroll, Carl E. Heiles, Richard Conn Henry, Christopher McKee, Péter Mészáros and Paul R. Shapiro.

== Awards ==
- 1978 Karl Schwarzschild Medal
- 1989 Elected to the U.S. National Academy of Sciences
- 2014 Henry Norris Russell Lectureship
