= Dark Ages Radio Explorer =

Proposed concept lunar orbiter

The Dark Ages Radio Explorer (DARE) is a proposed NASA mission aimed at detecting redshifted line emissions from the earliest neutral hydrogen atoms, formed post-Cosmic Dawn. Emissions from these neutral hydrogen atoms, characterized by a rest wavelength of 21 cm and a frequency of 1420 MHz, offer insights into the formation of the universe's first stars and the epoch succeeding the cosmic Dark Ages. The intended orbiter aims to investigate the universe's state from approximately 80 million years to 420 million years post-Big Bang by capturing the line emissions at their redshifted frequencies originating from that period. Data collected by this mission is expected to shed light on the genesis of the first stars, the rapid growth of the initial black holes, and the universe's reionization process. Moreover, it would facilitate the testing of computational galaxy formation models. Furthermore, the mission could advance research into dark matter decay and inform the development of lunar surface telescopes, enhancing the exploration of exoplanets around proximate stars.

== Background ==
The epoch between recombination and the emergence of stars and galaxies is termed the "cosmic Dark Ages". In this era, neutral hydrogen predominated the universe's matter composition. While this hydrogen has not yet been directly observed, ongoing experiments aim to detect the characteristic hydrogen line from this period. The hydrogen line arises when an electron in a neutral hydrogen atom transitions between hyperfine states, either by excitation to a state with aligned spins or by de-excitation as the spins move from alignment to anti-alignment. The energy differential between these hyperfine states, $5.9 \times 10^{-6}$ electron volts, equates to a photon with a wavelength of 21 centimeters. When neutral hydrogen attains thermodynamic equilibrium with cosmic microwave background (CMB) photons, a "coupling" occurs, rendering the hydrogen line undetectable. Observation of the hydrogen line is feasible only when there is a temperature discrepancy between the neutral hydrogen and the CMB.

== Theoretical motivation ==
In the immediate aftermath of the Big Bang, the universe was characterized by intense heat, density, and near-uniformity. Its subsequent expansion and cooling created conducive conditions for nuclear and atomic formation. Around 400,000 years post-Big Bang, at a redshift of approximately 1100, the cooling of primordial plasma allowed protons and electrons to merge into neutral hydrogen atoms, rendering the universe transparent as photons ceased to interact significantly with matter. These ancient photons are detectable in the present as the cosmic microwave background (CMB). The CMB reveals a universe that remained smooth and homogeneous.

Following the formation of the initial hydrogen atoms, the universe was composed of an almost entirely neutral, uniformly distributed intergalactic medium (IGM), predominantly made up of hydrogen gas. This epoch, devoid of luminous bodies, is referred to as the cosmic Dark Ages. Theoretical models forecast that, over subsequent hundreds of millions of years, gravitational forces gradually compressed the gas into denser regions, culminating in the emergence of the first stars—a milestone known as Cosmic Dawn.

The formation of additional stars and the assembly of the earliest galaxies inundated the universe with ultraviolet photons, which had the potential to ionize hydrogen gas. Several hundred million years post-Cosmic Dawn, the initial stars emitted sufficient ultraviolet photons to reionize the vast majority of hydrogen atoms in the universe. This reionization epoch signifies the IGM's transition back to a state of near-complete ionization.

Observational studies have not yet explored the universe's emerging structural complexity. Studying the universe's earliest structures necessitates a telescope surpassing the capabilities of the Hubble Space Telescope. While theoretical models indicate that current measurements are starting to examine the concluding phase of Reionization, the initial stars and galaxies from the Dark Ages and Cosmic Dawn remain beyond the observational reach of contemporary instruments.

The envisioned DARE mission aims to conduct pioneering measurements of the inception of the first stars and black holes, as well as ascertain the characteristics of hitherto undetectable stellar populations. These observations would contextualize existing data and enhance our comprehension of the developmental processes of the first galaxies from antecedent cosmic structures.

== Mission ==
The DARE mission aims to analyze the spectral profile of the sky-averaged, redshifted 21-cm signal within a 40–120 MHz radio bandpass, targeting neutral hydrogen at redshifts between 11-35, corresponding to a period 420-80 million years subsequent to the Big Bang. DARE's tentative schedule involves a 3-year lunar orbit, focusing on data collection above the Moon's far side—a region considered devoid of human-made radio frequency interference and substantial ionospheric activity.

The mission's scientific apparatus, affixed to an RF-quiet spacecraft bus, comprises a three-part radiometer system featuring an electrically short, tapered, biconical dipole antenna, along with a receiver and a digital spectrometer. DARE's utilization of the antenna's smooth frequency response and a differential spectral calibration technique is anticipated to mitigate intense cosmic foregrounds, thereby facilitating the detection of the faint cosmic 21-cm signal.

== Related initiatives ==
In addition to the DARE mission, several other initiatives have been proposed to investigate this field. These include the Precision Array for Probing the Epoch of Reionization (PAPER), the Low Frequency Array (LOFAR), the Murchison Widefield Array (MWA), the Giant Metrewave Radio Telescope (GMRT), and the Large Aperture Experiment to Detect the Dark Ages (LEDA).

== See also ==
- Reionization
- Wouthuysen-Field coupling
