= Carl E. Heiles =

American astrophysicist

Carl Eugene Heiles (born 1939) is an American astrophysicist noted for his contributions to the understanding of diffuse interstellar matter through observational radio astronomy.

== Biography ==
Heiles was born in Toledo, Ohio. He did his undergraduate work at Cornell University, receiving a degree in engineering physics, and then received his doctorate under George B. Field in 1966 from Princeton University in astrophysical sciences. He has worked at the University of California, Berkeley, since then and is currently a professor of astronomy.

== Research ==
While Heiles was still a graduate student at Princeton, he wrote a paper with Michel Hénon about a third integral of motion in axisymmetric potentials, from which the Hénon-Heiles equation is derived. Though his paper with Hénon has been cited more than all but one of his other papers, most of Heiles's work has been in the field of radio astronomy. Heiles was part of the team which discovered the first millisecond pulsar, PSR B1937+21. Heiles has also been pivotal in understanding the diffuse gas in the interstellar medium, primarily through observation of the hydrogen line. His role in this field is such that a conference at Arecibo Observatory in Puerto Rico on diffuse matter was held in honor of Heiles's 65th birthday. Observations of this gas have helped develop a better understanding of star formation and galactic gravitational and magnetic fields.

== Honors ==
- Dannie Heineman Prize for Astrophysics in 1989 for outstanding work in astrophysics.
- Noyce Prize for Excellence in Undergraduate Teaching in 2002
- Member of the National Academy of Sciences

He was elected a Legacy Fellow of the American Astronomical Society in 2020.
