= Decoupling (cosmology) =

Type of event in the early universe

In cosmology, decoupling is a period in the development of the universe when different types of particles fall out of thermal equilibrium with each other. This occurs as a result of the expansion of the universe, as their interaction rates decrease (and mean free paths increase) up to this critical point. The two verified instances of decoupling since the Big Bang which are most often discussed are photon decoupling and neutrino decoupling, as these led to the cosmic microwave background and cosmic neutrino background, respectively.

Photon decoupling is closely related to recombination, which occurred about 378,000 years after the Big Bang (at a redshift of z = 1100), when the universe was a hot opaque ("foggy") plasma. During recombination, free electrons became bound to protons (hydrogen nuclei) to form neutral hydrogen atoms. Because direct recombinations to the ground state (lowest energy) of hydrogen are very inefficient, these hydrogen atoms generally form with the electrons in a high energy state, and the electrons quickly transition to their low energy state by emitting photons. Because the neutral hydrogen that formed was transparent to light, those photons which were not captured by other hydrogen atoms were able, for the first time in the history of the universe, to travel long distances. They can still be detected today, although they now appear as radio waves, and form the cosmic microwave background ("CMB"). They reveal crucial clues about how the universe formed.

== Photon decoupling ==
Photon decoupling occurred when the universe expands enough that photons become unlikely to scatter off electrons. This occurred abruptly when the rate of Compton scattering of photons $\Gamma$ was approximately equal to the rate of expansion of the universe $H$, or alternatively when the mean free path of the photons $\lambda$ was approximately equal to the horizon size of the universe $H^{-1}$. After this photons were able to stream freely, producing the cosmic microwave background as we know it, and the universe became transparent. The event coincides with recombination, the time when atoms form from free electrons and protons, emitting photons, but the physics of the two events differ. There were very many more photons than electrons.

The interaction rate of the photons is given by

$$\Gamma = \frac{c}{\lambda} = n_e \sigma_t c$$

where $n_e$ is the number density of free electrons, $\sigma_t$ is the electron Thomson scattering area, and $c$ is the speed of light.

In the matter-dominated era (when recombination takes place),

$$H \approx H_0 a^{-{3/2}}$$

where $a$ is the cosmic scale factor and H_{0} is the Hubble constant. $\Gamma$ also decreases as a more complicated function of $a$, at a faster rate than $H$. By working out the precise dependence of $H$ and $\Gamma$ on the scale factor and equating $\Gamma=H$, it is possible to show that photon decoupling occurred approximately 380,000 years after the Big Bang, at a redshift of $z = 1100$ when the universe was at a temperature around 3000 K.

== Neutrino decoupling ==
Another example is the neutrino decoupling which occurred within one second of the Big Bang. Analogous to the decoupling of photons, neutrinos decoupled when the rate of weak interactions between neutrinos and other forms of matter dropped below the rate of expansion of the universe, producing a cosmic neutrino background of freely streaming neutrinos. This neutrino background will have a lower temperature than the cosmic microwave background because shortly after neutrino decoupling the electrons and positrons in the plasma combine or annihilate, producing photons and heat.

One way to estimate the temperature of the neutrino background is use conservation of entropy. The ratio of the entropy, s just before and after this annihilation is given by ratio of the number of degrees of freedom:
$$\frac{s_\gamma + s_{e^-} + s_{e^+}}{s_\gamma} = \left(\frac{2 + \tfrac{7}{4} + \tfrac{7}{4}}{2}\right) = 11/4.$$
Since the temperature scales with the cube root of the entropy,
$$\frac{T_\nu}{T_\gamma} = \left( \frac{4}{11} \right)^{1/3}$$
and the measured cosmic microwave background today, $T_\gamma$, is 2.75K, the cosmic neutrino background temperature, $T_\nu$, is estimated to be 1.95K.

== WIMPs: non-relativistic decoupling ==
Decoupling may also have occurred for the dark matter candidate, WIMPs. These are known as "cold relics", meaning they decoupled after they became non-relativistic (by comparison, photons and neutrinos decoupled while still relativistic and are known as "hot relics"). By calculating the hypothetical time and temperature of decoupling for non-relativistic WIMPs of a particular mass, it is possible to find their density. Comparing this to the measured density parameter of cold dark matter today of 0.222 $\pm$ 0.0026 it is possible to rule out WIMPs of certain masses as reasonable dark matter candidates.

== See also ==
- Recombination
- Chronology of the universe
- Wouthuysen–Field coupling
