= Richard Klein =

Richard Klein may refer to:

- Richard Klein (astronomer), American professor
- Richard Klein (artist) (1890–1967), German artist active during the Nazi era
- Richard Klein (paleoanthropologist) (born 1941), American professor
- Richard Klein (television executive) (born 1958), British television executive
- Richard Rudolf Klein (1921–2011), German composer, musician and teacher
- Dick Klein (basketball) (1920–2000), American basketball player
- Dick Klein (American football) (1934–2005), American football player

== See also ==
- Richard Kline (disambiguation)
