= Richard Kline (disambiguation) =

Richard Kline (born 1944) is an American actor.

Richard Kline is also the name of:

- Richard H. Kline (1926–2018), cinematographer
- Richard S. Kline (1940–2020), game show producer/director
- Rick Kline, also known as Richard C. Kline, American sound engineer

== See also ==
- Richard Klein (disambiguation)
