= Excitation temperature =

Concept in statistical mechanics

In statistical mechanics, the excitation temperature (T_{ex}) quantifies the relative population of two energy levels in a system of particles. It is defined by the equation

$$\frac{n_{\rm u}}{n_{\rm l}} = \frac{g_{\rm u}}{g_{\rm l}} \exp{ \left(-\frac{\Delta E}{k T_{\rm ex}} \right) },$$

where

- n_{u} is the number of particles in an upper (e.g. excited) state;
- g_{u} is the statistical weight (degeneracy) of the upper state;
- n_{l} is the number of particles in a lower (e.g. ground) state;
- g_{l} is the statistical weight of the lower state;
- exp is the exponential function;
- k is the Boltzmann constant;
- ΔE is the difference in energy between the upper and lower states.

In thermal equilibrium, the excitation temperature is equal to the thermodynamic temperature of the system, and the level populations follow the Boltzmann distribution, so that the right-hand side of the equation reduces to the corresponding Boltzmann factor. Excitation temperature can always be defined, even if the system is not in thermal equilibrium.

By measuring the relative intensity of two spectral emission lines corresponding to transitions from two different levels to the ground state, the ratio $n_\textrm{u}/n_\textrm{l}$ can be estimated. Applying this approach to lightning gives an estimated excitation temperature around 27000 K, with considerable variation due to differing amounts of current in each stroke.

The excitation temperature can even be a negative temperature for a system with inverted levels (such as a maser).

The 21 cm line of hydrogen is a spin-flip transition so the apparent value of the excitation temperature is often called the "spin temperature".
