= Christopher McKee =

Astrophysicist

Christopher Fulton McKee (born 1942) is an astrophysicist.

McKee attended Phillips Academy and Harvard University, and obtained a Ph.D. from the University of California, Berkeley (UCB) in 1970 under advisor George B. Field. In 1974, he was appointed professor of physics and astronomy, University of California at Berkeley. He is a member of the National Academy of Sciences and has been chair of the UCB Physics Department. He is a former member (1990) and chairman (2000) of the NASA Astronomy and Astrophysics Survey Committee (the "decadal review") and former director of the Space Sciences Laboratory (SSL) at UCB.

McKee performed the first simulations of relativistic counter-streaming plasmas as part of his Ph.D. thesis at Berkeley (1970). He began his study of the interstellar medium by pointing out the existence of reverse shocks in young supernova remnants, and he then analyzed the interaction of a supernova blast wave with interstellar clouds. Since joining the Physics and Astronomy Departments in Berkeley in 1974, he has devoted much of his research to studying processes in the interstellar medium, including evaporation of clouds, the structure of shock waves in atomic and molecular gas, and the dynamics of blast waves in both homogeneous and inhomogeneous media. In collaboration with Jeremiah Ostriker (Columbia University), he developed the three-phase model of the interstellar medium, which has been widely used to organize and interpret observational data.

His research on quasars has included development of the relativistic blast wave model for variability, introduction of reverberation mapping to analyze variable emission line profiles, the two-phase model for quasar emission line regions, and the development of the theory of coronae and winds from accretion disks.

He has developed a self-regulated model for the structure and evolution of molecular clouds, and for the rate of star formation within these clouds.

He established the Berkeley Astrophysical Fluid Dynamics Group with Richard Klein to develop the technique of adaptive mesh refinement for numerical simulations of astrophysical fluid dynamics.

In his three decades as a professor at UCB, he has advised many graduate students and postdoctoral research fellows.

He was elected a Legacy Fellow of the American Astronomical Society in 2020.
