= Alessandro Melchiorri =

Cosmologist

Alessandro Melchiorri (born 1969, Rome) is an Italian cosmologist and full professor of astrophysics (sector FIS/05) at the Department of Physics "G. Marconi" of Sapienza University of Rome. He is a member of INFN (Roma1 section) and of the Accademia Nazionale delle Scienze (Accademia dei XL). In 2025, he was named a Clarivate Highly Cited Researcher, a distinction awarded to scientists whose publications rank in the top 1% of citations globally in their field.

== Career ==
Melchiorri completed his academic training at Sapienza University of Rome, where he has conducted research and teaching throughout his career. He teaches Physical Cosmology and an undergraduate astronomy course. He is principal investigator of the INFN Roma1 Sapienza cosmology node.

== Research ==
His research focuses on observational cosmology, including the cosmic microwave background (CMB), determination of cosmological parameters, dark energy, the Hubble tension, and cosmological neutrino physics.

=== BOOMERanG experiment ===
Melchiorri was first author of the 1999 study A Measurement of Ω from the North American Test Flight of Boomerang, published in The Astrophysical Journal Letters, which used the CMB angular power spectrum to constrain the geometry of the universe, providing early observational evidence that the total energy density is consistent with a flat universe. The results were covered by The New York Times in November 1999. He also participated as co-author in the main BOOMERanG paper published in Nature in 2000, which produced the first high-resolution maps of CMB anisotropies over a significant part of the sky.

=== Cosmic neutrino background ===
In 2005, Melchiorri and Roberto Trotta published Indication for Primordial Anisotropies in the Neutrino Background from WMAP and SDSS in Physical Review Letters, providing the first observational indication of primordial anisotropies in the cosmic neutrino background, detected by combining data from the WMAP satellite and the Sloan Digital Sky Survey. The result confirmed predictions of both the Big Bang theory and the Standard Model of particle physics. The discovery was reported by Nature News, Phys.org, and other major international outlets.

=== Planck mission ===
Melchiorri was a member of the Planck scientific collaboration. The Planck team was awarded the Gruber Cosmology Prize in 2018 by the Gruber Foundation (Yale University), one of the most prestigious international awards in cosmology, for mapping the temperature and polarization of the CMB with unprecedented precision.

=== Closed universe and cosmological tensions ===
In 2019, Melchiorri was corresponding author of Planck evidence for a closed Universe and a possible crisis for cosmology, published in Nature Astronomy with Eleonora Di Valentino and Joseph Silk. The paper showed that Planck 2018 data prefer a positively curved universe at more than 99% confidence level, posing a potential challenge to the standard cosmological model (ΛCDM). The paper received widespread international coverage, including in Scientific American, New Scientist, and La Repubblica. Sapienza University dedicated an institutional press release to the work, quoting Melchiorri as corresponding author.

== Recognition ==
- Member of the Planck collaboration, recipient of the Gruber Cosmology Prize 2018 (Gruber Foundation, Yale University).
- Named Highly Cited Researcher 2025 by Clarivate, identifying researchers in the top 1% most cited globally by field.
- Fellow of the Accademia Nazionale delle Scienze (Accademia dei XL).

== Selected publications ==
- Melchiorri, A.; et al. (2000). "A Measurement of Ω from the North American Test Flight of Boomerang". The Astrophysical Journal Letters. 536 (2): L63–L66. arXiv:astro-ph/9911445. Bibcode:2000ApJ...536L..63M. doi:10.1086/312744. PMID 10859119.
- de Bernardis, P.; et al. (2000). "A flat Universe from high-resolution maps of the cosmic microwave background radiation". Nature. 404 (6781): 955–959. arXiv:astro-ph/0004404. Bibcode:2000Natur.404..955D. doi:10.1038/35010035. PMID 10801117.
- Trotta, R.; Melchiorri, A. (2005). "Indication for Primordial Anisotropies in the Neutrino Background from WMAP and SDSS". Physical Review Letters. 95 (1) 011305. arXiv:astro-ph/0412066. doi:10.1103/PhysRevLett.95.011305. PMID 16090604.
- Di Valentino, E.; Melchiorri, A.; Silk, J. (2020). "Planck evidence for a closed Universe and a possible crisis for cosmology". Nature Astronomy. 4 (2): 196–203. arXiv:1911.02087. Bibcode:2020NatAs...4..196D. doi:10.1038/s41550-019-0906-9.
