= Eric G. Blackman =

American astrophysicist and professor

- Born: September 21, 1968 (age 57); Rochester, New York, U.S.
- Education: Harvard University; University of Cambridge; MIT; Harley School
- Scientific career
- Fields: Theoretical Astrophysics, Plasma Physics, Physics of Brain Injury Mitigation
- Workplaces: Present: University of Rochester; Past: Institute for Advanced Study; Institute for Defense Analyses; Caltech; University of Cambridge; General Electric Research Laboratory
- Doctoral advisor: George B. Field
- Website: www.pas.rochester.edu/~blackman

Eric Glen Blackman (born September 21, 1968 in Rochester, New York) is an American astrophysicist and professor.

== Education and career ==
Blackman graduated from the Harley School, and then obtained undergraduate degrees in physics and mathematics from the Massachusetts Institute of Technology. He worked at the General Electric Research Laboratory during undergraduate summers. He subsequently completed a Master of Advanced Study in mathematics (applied math/theoretical physics, Part III of the Mathematical Tripos) at Cambridge University, residing at Trinity College, Cambridge, followed by a Phd at Harvard University working in theoretical astrophysics with George B. Field. He was a postdoctoral fellow at the Institute of Astronomy, Cambridge of Cambridge University and in physics at Caltech before joining the department of physics and astronomy at the University of Rochester.

Blackman has made diverse contributions to theoretical astrophysics through 300+ research publications on topics that include stellar and planetary astrophysics, molecular clouds, planetary nebulae, accretion, jets, particle acceleration, turbulence, laboratory astrophysics, and relativistic astrophysics—including gamma-ray bursts and active galactic nuclei. He is particularly known for work in plasma astrophysics involving magnetic fields, and principles of astrophysical dynamo theory—the latter being a theory of magnetic field origin in astrophysical objects such as galaxies, stars, accretion disks and planets. Blackman has also worked on the mechanics and biomechanics of helmet protection against closed traumatic brain injury, identifying protection deficiencies in standard helmets for both head impacts and blast exposure.

== Appointments and awards ==
- 1994 Jewett Fund Prize, Harvard University (Cambridge MA)
- 2000-2003 Assistant & Associate Professor of Physics and Astronomy, University of Rochester (Rochester NY)
- 2000-2004 Faculty Development Grant Award in Plasma Physics, US Department of Energy
- 2004–present Professor of Physics and Astronomy, University of Rochester (Rochester NY)
- 2005–present Fellow of the American Physical Society
- 2006-2007 Defense Science Study Group, Institute for Defense Analyses (Alexandria VA)
- 2014-2015 Simons Fellow in Theoretical Physics
- 2014-2015 IBM-Einstein Fellow Institute for Advanced Study (Princeton NJ)
