= Chronology of the universe =

History and future of the universe

External videos
- 3D simulation visualizes history of the Universe begins just 12 million years after the Big Bang and illustrates the formation of stars, heavy elements, galaxies, exploding super novae and dark matter over 14 billion years on YouTube // Discover Magazine — May 7, 2014

The chronology of the universe describes the history and future of the universe according to the current understanding of physical cosmology. In this model, the earliest stage that is supported by observational evidence is known as inflation, which occurred 13.8 billion years ago. During this epoch, space underwent a period of extremely rapid expansion in a tiny fraction of a second. Once inflation ended, the energy that was responsible for it was converted into particles and radiation, heating up the universe into a very hot and dense state, initiating the Big Bang.

At some early stage, baryogenesis produced a small excess of matter over antimatter. Most matter and antimatter particles annihilated each other in pairs, leaving behind a small excess of matter and a large amount of radiation. As the universe cooled further, many other heavy particles annihilated each other or decayed, eventually leaving behind a plasma that was dominated by protons, neutrons, electrons, photons, and neutrinos.

After the first second, the plasma became dilute enough so that neutrinos ceased interacting efficiently with the other particles and instead started free streaming through the universe, producing the primordial neutrino background. Five seconds later, pair production created electrons and positrons annihilated each other, transferring their energy into the rest of the plasma.

Within the first three minutes, the temperature became low enough to enable stable nuclei to start forming in a process known as Big Bang nucleosynthesis, resulting in hydrogen, helium, and a small amount of lithium. In most models of cosmology, dark matter is usually assumed to have been produced by this epoch, although its production mechanism is unknown. Around 380,000 years later, electrons were captured by the nucleons, forming stable atoms. With this, the universe became transparent to photons, producing the cosmic microwave background.

The next phase of the universe involved the gradual gravitational collapse of the atomic gas. As the gas was compressed and heated, it eventually ignited nuclear fusion, creating the first stars. Gravitational attraction over the subsequent millions of years formed galaxies and the larger structures visible today. After a further nine billion years, the universe transitioned from a matter-dominated universe into a dark energy–dominated universe, leading to the accelerated cosmic expansion that we see today.

Many modifications to the standard timeline have been proposed, introducing novel phases of expansion, particles, or other cosmological mechanisms. These often focus on modifications to the chronology before Big Bang nucleosynthesis, since there is a lack of direct observational evidence to determine exactly what happened. Viable alternatives to inflation that still result in the observed large-scale structure have also been proposed.

== Background ==
=== Expansion ===
The current accepted model of the history of the universe is based on the concept of inflationary cosmology and the Big Bang. During inflation, the universe expanded at an exponential rate. Once this ended, cosmic expansion subsequently decelerated to much slower rates. The energy driving inflation was converted to a hot and dense plasma, initiating the hot Big Bang, during which the universe cooled as it expanded. Different particles interact during each major stage in the expansion; as the universe expands the density falls and some particle interactions cease to be important. The character of the universe changes. Moreover, the rate of the expansion itself depends upon the nature of the existing particles, creating an interplay between cosmology and particle physics.

=== Time ===
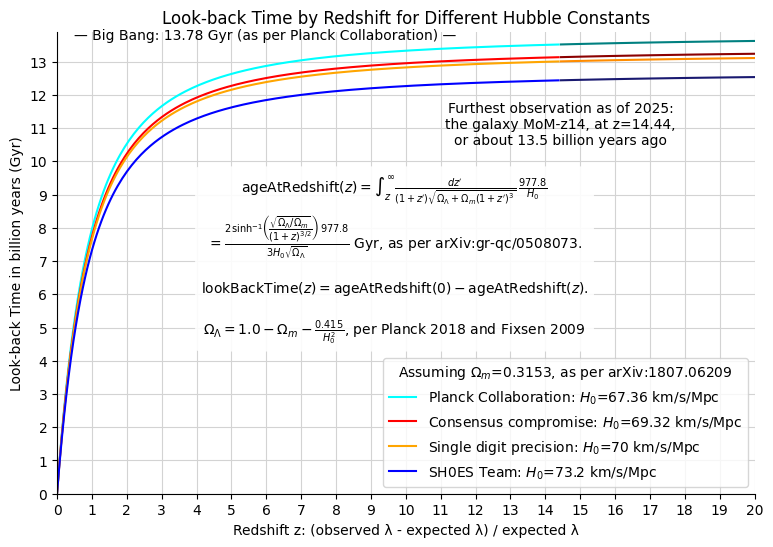
The lookback time of extragalactic observations by their cosmological redshift up to z=20.

In cosmology, time and space are connected: space expands as time increases. Time at each point in space (e.g. a galaxy) can be uniquely defined in terms of an imaginary clock at that point. These clocks move with the point in space as the universe expands; they are synchronized to a single point in the distant past.

Light from distant galaxies is emitted in the past then travels at the speed of light: knowledge about a distant galaxy is limited to one point in time called the lookback time. During the journey from a distant point, the universe continues to expand, stretching the wavelength of the light along the way, an effect called cosmological redshift. The redshift can be measured by comparing incoming light to known spectroscopic lines and the resulting value can be related to the comoving distance to the emitter. Consequently, experimental knowledge about the chronology of the universe is derived by observing distant light.

== Overview ==
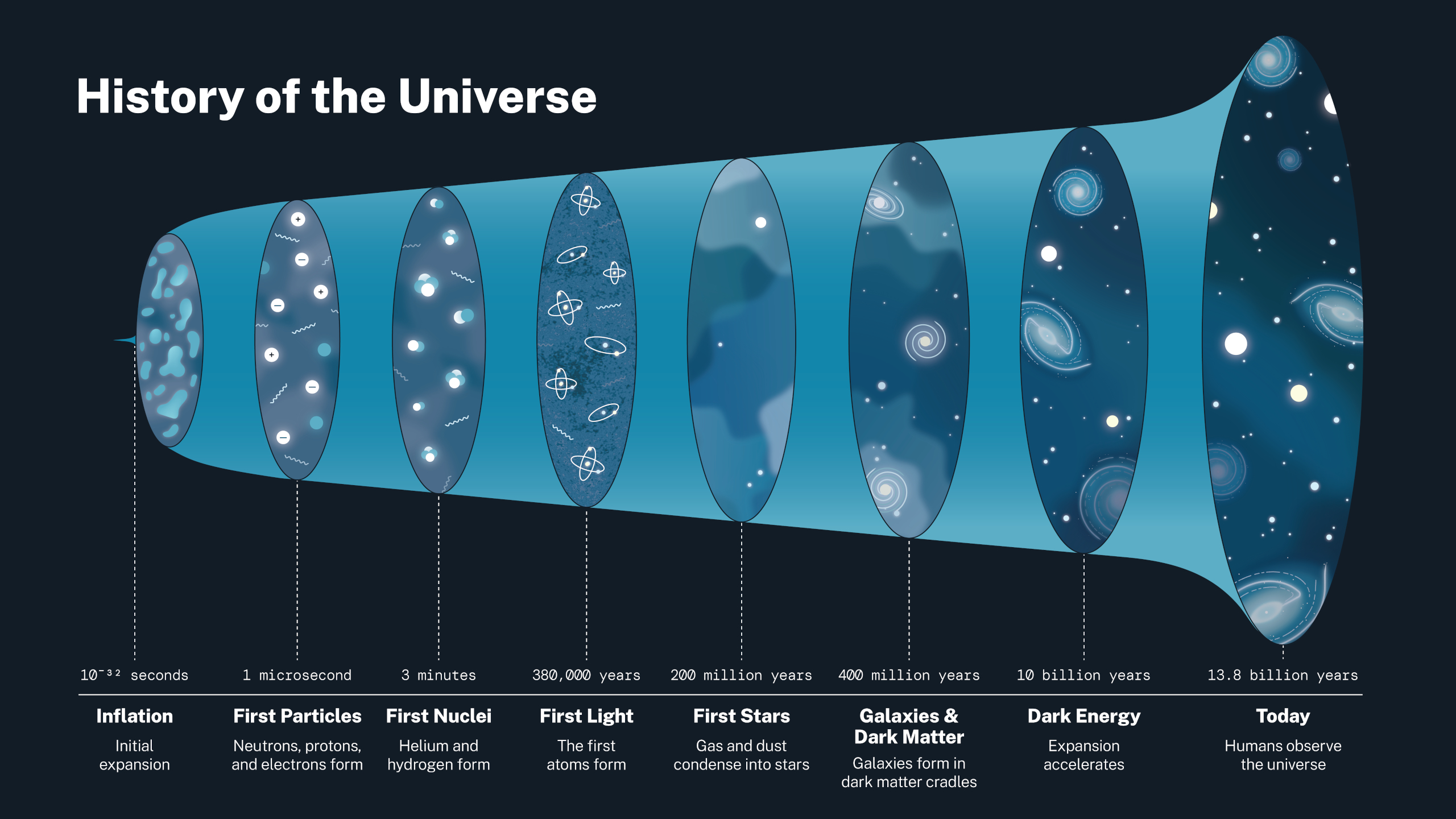
The NASA diagram shows the history of the universe from inflation until the present.

The chronology of the universe can be divided into four parts:

- Inflation, the first era supported by experimental evidence, a period of exponential expansion that ends with the conversion of energy into particles during reheating,
- Hot Big Bang, the universe cools and expands from a hot dense state, forming baryons, nuclei, and the Cosmic Microwave Background,
- Gravity builds cosmic structure, reduced density allows matter to dominate over radiation for control of expansion and gravitational attraction builds stars, galaxies, and clusters of galaxies.
- Cosmic acceleration, continued expansion allows dark energy to overcome gravitational force, inhibiting larger structures.

With these large subsections are many events and transitions. Older models divided the chronology differently, using different terminology or emphasis.

=== Tabular summary ===
Modern cosmological chronologies begin with inflation, the earliest time period supported by solid observational evidence. Anything earlier is considered non-standard cosmology, the subject of a great deal of as-yet-unconfirmed research.

Article subsection	Cosmic time	Redshift	Temperature	Description
Inflation	unknown		not applicable	Cosmic inflation expands space by a factor of the order of 10^{26} over a time of the order of 10^{−36} to 10^{−32} seconds.
Reheating	unknown		unknown	Converts the energy in the inflation field into a thermal bath of Standard Model particles, initiating the Hot Big Bang. Many mechanisms have been proposed.
Baryogenesis	unknown		unknown	Matter and antimatter are created with one extra particle of matter for every 10^{10} pairs. The pairs annihilate producing photons and leaving the matter particles. Many mechanisms have been proposed but no observations select one.
Electroweak phase transition	10^{−11} s	10^{15}	10^{15} K (100 GeV/k_{B})	The electroweak interaction becomes manifest as two distinct forces, the electromagnetic interaction and weak interaction. Matter particles have mass. The sphere of space that will become the observable universe is approximately 300 light-seconds (~0.6 AU) in radius at this time.
Quantum chromodynamics phase transition	10^{−5} s	10^{12}	10^{12} K (150 MeV/k_{B})	The quark–gluon plasma of matter particles coalesce into hadrons: mostly protons, neutrons, and pions.
Neutrino decoupling	1 s	6×10^{9}	10^{10} K (1 MeV/k_{B})	Neutrinos cease interacting with baryonic matter, and form cosmic neutrino background. The sphere of space that will become the observable universe is approximately 10 light-years in radius at this time.
Electron–positron annihilation	6 s	2×10^{9}	10^{10} K – 10^{9} K (1 MeV/k_{B} – 100 keV/k_{B})	As the temperature falls, photons no longer have sufficient energy to produce electron/positron pairs. Electrons and positrons annihilate, leaving photons.
Big Bang nucleosynthesis	10 s – 1000 s	4×10^{8}	10^{9} K – 10^{7} K (0.1 MeV/k_{B} – 1 keV/k_{B})	Protons and neutrons are bound into primordial atomic nuclei: hydrogen and helium-4. Trace amounts of deuterium, helium-3, and lithium-7 also form. At the end of this epoch, the spherical volume of space which will become the observable universe is about 300 light-years in radius, baryonic matter density is on the order of 4 grams per m^{3} (about 0.3% of sea level air density)—however, most energy at this time is in electromagnetic radiation.
Recombination	290 ka – 370 ka	1090 – 1270	4000 K (0.4 eV/k_{B})	Electrons and atomic nuclei first become bound to form neutral atoms. Photons are no longer in thermal equilibrium with matter and the universe first becomes transparent. Recombination lasts for about 100 ka, during which the universe is becoming more and more transparent to photons. The photons of the cosmic microwave background radiation originate at this time. The spherical volume of space that will become the observable universe is 42 million light-years in radius at this time. The baryonic matter density at this time is about 500 million hydrogen and helium atoms per cubic metre, approximately a billion times higher than today. This density corresponds to pressure on the order of 10^{−17} atm.
Dark Ages	370 ka – 150 Ma? (Only fully ends by about 1 Ga)	1100 – 20	4000 K – 60 K	The time between recombination and the formation of the first stars. During this time, the only source of photons was hydrogen emitting radio waves at hydrogen line. Freely propagating CMB photons quickly (within about 3 million years) red-shifted to infrared, and the universe was devoid of visible light.
Star and galaxy formation and evolution	Earliest galaxies: from about 300–400 Ma? (first stars: similar or earlier) Modern galaxies: 1 Ga – 10 Ga (exact timings being researched)	From about 20	From about 60 K	The earliest known galaxies existed by about 280 Ma. Galaxies coalesce into "proto-clusters" from about 1 Ga (redshift z = 6) and into galaxy clusters beginning at 3 Ga (z = 2.1), and into superclusters from about 5 Ga (z = 1.2). See: list of galaxy groups and clusters, list of superclusters.
Reionization	200 Ma – 1 Ga (exact timings being researched)	20 – 6	60 K – 19 K	The most distant astronomical objects observable with telescopes date to this period; as of June 2025, the most remote galaxy observed is MoM-z14, at a redshift of 14.44. The earliest "modern" Population I stars are formed in this period.
Present time	13.8 Ga	0	2.7 K	Farthest observable photons at this moment are CMB photons. They arrive from a sphere with a radius of 46 billion light-years. The spherical volume inside it is commonly referred to as the observable universe.
Alternative subdivisions of the chronology (overlapping several of the above periods)
Radiation-dominated era	From inflation (~ 10^{−32} sec) – 47 ka	> 3600	> 10^{4} K	During this time, the energy density of massless and near-massless relativistic components such as photons and neutrinos, which move at or close to the speed of light, dominate both matter density and dark energy.
Matter-dominated era	47 ka – 9.8 Ga	3600 – 0.4	10^{4} K – 4 K	During this time, the energy density of matter dominates both radiation density and dark energy, resulting in a decelerated expansion of the universe.
Dark energy–dominated era	> 9.8 Ga	< 0.4	< 4 K	Matter density falls below dark energy density (vacuum energy), and expansion of space begins to accelerate. This time happens to correspond roughly to the time of the formation of the Solar System and the evolutionary history of life.
Stelliferous Era	150 Ma – 100 Ta	20 – −0.99	60 K – 0.03 K	The time between the first formation of Population III stars until the cessation of star formation, leaving all stars in the form of degenerate remnants.
Far future	> 100 Ta	< −0.99	< 0.1 K	The stelliferous era will end as stars eventually die and fewer are born to replace them, leading to a darkening universe. Various theories suggest a number of subsequent possibilities. Assuming proton decay, the matter may eventually evaporate into a Dark Era (heat death). Alternatively, the universe may collapse in a Big Crunch. Other suggested ends include a false vacuum catastrophe or a Big Rip as possible ends to the universe.

== Inflationary cosmology ==
=== Inflation ===
At this point of the very early universe, the universe is thought to have expanded by at least a factor of 10^{26} in time on the order of 10^{−36} seconds. All of the mass-energy in all of the galaxies currently visible started in a sphere with a radius around 4×10^{−29} m, then grew to a sphere with a radius around 0.9m by the end of inflation. This phase of the cosmic expansion history is known as inflation or sometimes as the inflationary epoch.

Inflation explains how today's universe has concentrations of matter, like galaxies and clusters of galaxies, rather than having matter spatially uniform through the universe. Tiny quantum fluctuations in the universe, amplified by inflation, are believed to be the basis of large-scale structures that formed much later.

The mechanism that drove inflation remains unknown, although many models have been put forward. In several of the more prominent models, it is thought to have been triggered by the separation of the strong and electroweak interactions. One of the theoretical products of this phase transition was a scalar field called the inflaton field. As this field settled into its lowest-energy state throughout the universe, it generated an enormous repulsive force that led to a rapid expansion of the universe.

=== Reheating ===
The inflationary epoch is thought to have lasted between 10^{−33} and 10^{−32} seconds. The expansion of space meant that any elementary particles remaining from before inflation were now distributed very thinly across the universe to the point where there is no physical temperature that can be associated with them. However, the large potential energy of the inflaton field was released at the end of the inflationary epoch as the inflaton field decayed into other particles in a process known as reheating. This heating effect led to the universe being repopulated with a dense, hot mixture of Standard Model particles.

After inflation ended, the universe continued to expand. A region the size of a melon at that time has since grown to be the entire observable universe.

== Hot Big Bang ==
The physical model for the chronology of the universe with strong observational and theoretical support is called the hot Big Bang model. The concept includes an early state of extreme temperature and density followed by expansion of the universe continuing to this day. A high-precision version of the hot Big Bang model using conventional physics, known as Lambda-CDM, agrees with a wide array of astrophysical observations. The concept is not extrapolated back to zero time. Within the standard model of cosmology the initial state is set by the inflation process. The relative timeline for the earliest phenomena is unclear. Speculation on processes occurring before inflation involves physics considered outside of standard cosmology.

=== Baryogenesis ===
Baryons are subatomic particles such as protons and neutrons that are composed of three quarks. It would be expected that both baryons and particles known as antibaryons would have formed in equal numbers. However, almost no antibaryons are observed in nature. It is not clear how this came about. Any explanation for this phenomenon must allow the Sakharov conditions related to baryogenesis to have been satisfied at some time after the end of cosmological inflation. Current particle physics suggests asymmetries under which these conditions would be met, but these asymmetries appear to be too small to account for the observed baryon-antibaryon asymmetry of the universe.

=== Electroweak phase transition ===
10^{−12} seconds after the inflation

Above a temperature of around 10^{15} K, all the particles of the standard model were in thermal equilibrium. The electromagnetic and weak interaction had not yet separated, and the gauge bosons and fermions had not yet gained mass through the Higgs mechanism. This is sometimes referred to as the electroweak epoch. As the universe's temperature continued to fall, below 159.5±1.5 GeV/k_{B}, electroweak symmetry breaking happened. So far as is known, it was the penultimate symmetry breaking event in the formation of the universe, the final one being chiral symmetry breaking in the quark sector. This has two related effects:

1. Via the Higgs mechanism, all elementary particles interacting with the Higgs field became massive, having been massless at higher energy levels.
2. As a side-effect, the weak nuclear force and electromagnetic force, and their respective bosons (the W and Z bosons and photon) began to manifest differently in the present universe. Before electroweak symmetry breaking, these bosons were all massless particles and interacted over long distances, but at this point the W and Z bosons abruptly became massive particles only interacting over distances smaller than the size of an atom, while the photon remained massless and remained a long-distance interaction.

After electroweak symmetry breaking, the fundamental interactions that are known—gravitation, electromagnetic, weak and strong interactions—all took their present forms, and fundamental particles had their expected masses, but the temperature of the universe was still too high to allow the stable formation of many of the particles observed in the universe, so there were no protons or neutrons, and therefore no atoms, atomic nuclei, or molecules. (More precisely, any composite particles that formed by chance almost immediately broke up again due to the extreme energies.)

=== Quantum chromodynamics phase transition ===
Between 10^{−12} seconds and 10^{−5} seconds after the inflation

After cosmic inflation ended, the universe was filled with a hot quark–gluon plasma, the remains of reheating. From this point onwards the physics of the early universe is much better understood, and the energies involved in the quark epoch are directly accessible in particle physics experiments and other detectors.

The quark epoch began approximately 10^{−12} seconds after the inflation. This was the period in the evolution of the early universe immediately after electroweak symmetry breaking when the fundamental interactions of gravitation, electromagnetism, the strong interaction and the weak interaction had taken their present forms, but the temperature of the universe was still too high to allow quarks to bind together to form hadrons. The quark epoch ended when the universe was about 10^{−5} seconds old.

=== Neutrino decoupling and cosmic neutrino background (CνB) ===
Around 1 second after the inflation

At approximately 1 second after the inflation, neutrinos decouple and begin travelling freely through space. As neutrinos rarely interact with matter, these neutrinos still exist today, analogous to the much later cosmic microwave background emitted during recombination, around 370,000 years after the Big Bang. The neutrinos from this event have a very low energy, around 10^{−10} times the amount of those observable with present-day direct detection. Even high-energy neutrinos are notoriously difficult to detect, so this cosmic neutrino background (CνB) may not be directly observed in detail for many years, if at all.

However, Big Bang cosmology makes many predictions about the CνB, and there is very strong indirect evidence that the CνB exists, both from Big Bang nucleosynthesis predictions of the helium abundance, and from anisotropies in the cosmic microwave background (CMB). One of these predictions is that neutrinos will have left a subtle imprint on the CMB. It is well known that the CMB has irregularities. Some of the CMB fluctuations were roughly regularly spaced, because of the effect of baryonic acoustic oscillations. In theory, the decoupled neutrinos should have had a very slight effect on the phase of the various CMB fluctuations.

In 2015, it was reported that such shifts had been detected in the CMB. Moreover, the fluctuations corresponded to neutrinos of almost exactly the temperature predicted by Big Bang theory (1.96±0.02 K compared to a prediction of 1.95 K), and exactly three types of neutrino, the same number of neutrino flavors predicted by the Standard Model.

Cosmological models of this early time remain unsettled. The Standard Model of particle physics is only tested up to temperatures of order 10^{17}K (10 TeV) in particle colliders, such as the Large Hadron Collider. Moreover, new physical phenomena not yet covered by the Standard Model could have been important before the time of neutrino decoupling, when the temperature of the universe was about 10^{10}K (1 MeV).

=== Baryon annihilation ===
As the expansion continues and the temperature drops, radiation no longer has sufficient energy to produce hadrons or anti-hadrons. The existing anti-hadrons annihilate with hadrons, leaving a small remainder of hadrons which all decay in to the most stable type of hadron, a baryon like protons or neutrons. These baryons account for most normal matter of the universe today.

=== Electron–positron annihilation ===
Between 1 second and 10 seconds after the inflation

After baryogenesis the temperature was still high enough for leptons (like electrons and muons) and their antiparticles to be created from photons. Leptons and antileptons would annihilate back to photons, maintaining a state of equilibrium. This period is sometimes called the lepton epoch. About 10 seconds after the inflation, the temperature of the universe falls to the point at which new lepton–antilepton pairs are no longer created and the antileptons quickly annihilate the leptons, giving rise to pairs of high-energy photons, and leaving a small residue of leptons. After most leptons and antileptons are annihilated, most of the mass–energy in the universe is left in the form of photons.

=== Nucleosynthesis of light elements ===
Between 3 minutes and 20 minutes after the inflation

Between about 3 and 20 minutes after the inflation, nuclear fusion reactions convert a 1:7 mixture of neutrons and protons into a mix of protons, deuterium (a proton fused with a neutron), ^{3}He, ^{4}He, with trace amounts of ^{7}Li and ^{7}Be. These reactions end when the temperature falls below the 0.07MeV needed for nuclear fusion. The final mixture depends upon the reaction rates, the temperature, and the density of the components. The reaction rates can be measured in nuclear physics laboratories while the temperature and densities can be calculated from models of the expansion of the universe.

About 25% of the protons and all of the neutrons fuse to form deuterium, a hydrogen isotope, and almost all of the deuterium quickly fuses to form helium-4. Helium-4 has much higher binding energy than nuclei with 5 to 8 nucleons so only trace amounts of those nuclei are created. Heavier nuclei produced in stars do not appear because they require the combination of three Helium-4 nuclei and the density of Helium-4 is too low for many three way collisions to occur before the expansion cools the universe below the fusion temperature. Small amounts of tritium (another hydrogen isotope) and beryllium-7 and -8 are formed, but these are unstable and quickly decay. A small amount of deuterium is left unfused.

The amounts of each light element in the early universe can be estimated from old galaxies, and is strong evidence for the Big Bang. For example, the Big Bang should produce about 1 neutron for every 7 protons, allowing for 25% of all nucleons to be fused into helium-4 (2 protons and 2 neutrons out of every 16 nucleons), and this is the amount present today, and far more than can be explained by production in stars. Similarly, deuterium fuses extremely easily; any alternative explanation must also explain how conditions existed for deuterium to form, but also left some of that deuterium unfused and not immediately fused again into helium. Any alternative must also explain the proportions of the various light elements and their isotopes. A few isotopes, such as lithium-7, were found to be present in amounts that differed from theory.

=== Matter-radiation equality ===
47,000 years after the inflation

Until now, the universe's large-scale dynamics and behavior have been determined mainly by radiation—meaning, those constituents that move relativistically (at or near the speed of light), such as photons and neutrinos. As the universe cools, from around 47,000 years (redshift z = 3600), the universe's large-scale behavior becomes dominated by matter instead. This occurs because the energy density of matter begins to exceed both the energy density of radiation and the vacuum energy density. Around or shortly after 47,000 years, the densities of non-relativistic matter (atomic nuclei) and relativistic radiation (photons) become equal, the Jeans length, which determines the smallest structures that can form (due to competition between gravitational attraction and pressure effects), begins to fall and perturbations, instead of being wiped out by free streaming radiation, can begin to grow in amplitude.

According to the Lambda-CDM model, by this stage, the matter in the universe is around 84.5% cold dark matter and 15.5% "ordinary" matter. There is overwhelming evidence that dark matter exists and dominates the universe, but since the exact nature of dark matter is still not understood, the Big Bang theory does not presently cover any stages in its formation.

From this point on, and for several billion years to come, the presence of dark matter accelerates the formation of structure in the universe. In the early universe, dark matter gradually gathers in huge filaments under the effects of gravity, collapsing faster than ordinary (baryonic) matter because its collapse is not slowed by radiation pressure. This amplifies the tiny inhomogeneities (irregularities) in the density of the universe which were left by cosmic inflation. Over time, slightly denser regions become denser and slightly rarefied (emptier) regions become more rarefied. Ordinary matter eventually gathers together faster than it would otherwise do, because of the presence of these concentrations of dark matter.

The properties of dark matter that allow it to collapse quickly without radiation pressure also mean that it cannot lose energy by radiation. Losing energy is necessary for particles to collapse into dense structures beyond a certain point. Therefore, dark matter collapses into huge but diffuse filaments and haloes, and not into stars or planets. Ordinary matter, which can lose energy by radiation, forms gas clouds and later, more dense objects such as stars and planets when it collapses.

=== Recombination, photon decoupling, and the cosmic microwave background (CMB) ===
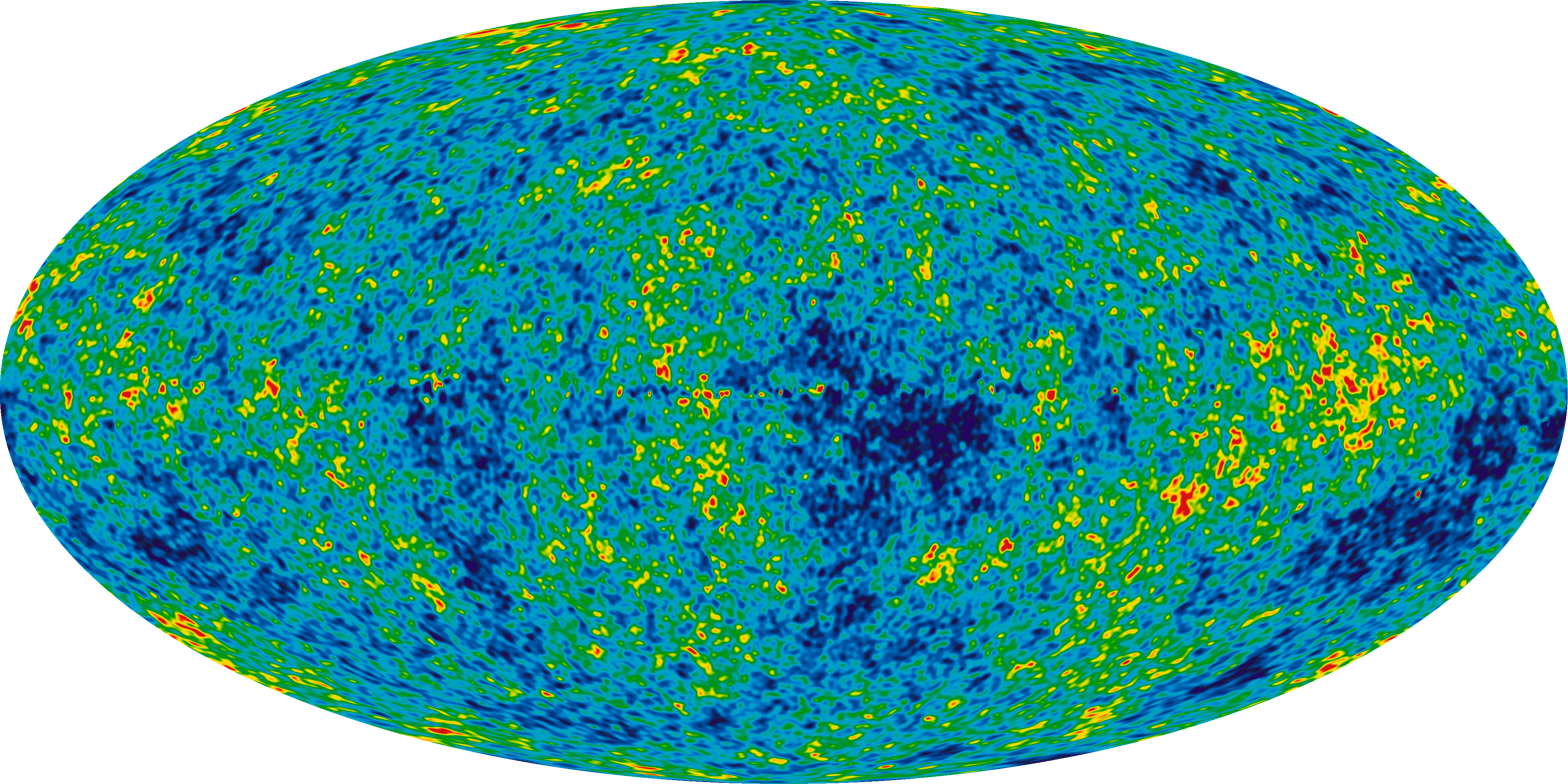
9-year WMAP image of the cosmic microwave background radiation (2012). The radiation is isotropic to roughly one part in 100,000.

About 370,000 years after the inflation, two connected events occurred: the ending of recombination and photon decoupling. Recombination describes the ionized particles combining to form the first neutral atoms, and decoupling refers to the photons released ("decoupled") as the newly formed atoms settle into more stable energy states.

Just before recombination, the baryonic matter in the universe was at a temperature where it formed a hot ionized plasma. Most of the photons in the universe interacted with electrons and protons, and could not travel significant distances without interacting with ionized particles. As a result, the universe was opaque or "foggy". Although there was light, it was not possible to see, nor is that light observable through telescopes.

Starting around 18,000 years, the universe has cooled to a point where free electrons can combine with helium nuclei to form He^{+} atoms. After around 50,000 years, as the universe cools, its behavior begins to be dominated by matter rather than radiation. At around 100,000 years, after the neutral helium atoms form, helium hydride is the first molecule. Much later, hydrogen and helium hydride react to form molecular hydrogen (H_{2}), the fuel needed for the first stars. At about 370,000 years, neutral hydrogen atoms finish forming ("recombination" of hydrogen ions and electrons), greatly reducing the Thomson scattering of photons. No longer scattered by free electrons, the photons were "decoupled" from the earlier plasma and propagated freely. The majority of these photons still exist as the cosmic microwave background (CMB). This is the oldest era of the universe that is directly observable today.

Directly combining in a low energy state (ground state) is less efficient, so these hydrogen atoms generally form with the electrons still in a high-energy state, and once combined, the electrons quickly release energy in the form of one or more photons as they transition to a low energy state. This release of photons is known as photon decoupling. Some of these decoupled photons are captured by other hydrogen atoms, the remainder remain free. By the end of recombination, most of the protons in the universe have formed neutral atoms. This change from charged to neutral particles means that the mean free path photons can travel before capture in effect becomes infinite, so any decoupled photons that have not been captured can travel freely over long distances (see Thomson scattering). The universe has become transparent to visible light, radio waves and other electromagnetic radiation for the first time in its history.

The background of this box approximates the original 4000 K color of the photons released during decoupling, before they became redshifted to form the cosmic microwave background. The entire universe would have appeared as a brilliantly glowing fog of a color similar to this and a temperature of 4000 K, at the time.

The photons released by these newly formed hydrogen atoms initially had a temperature/energy of around ~ 4000 K. This would have been visible to the eye as a pale yellow/orange tinted, or "soft", white color. Over billions of years since decoupling, as the universe has expanded, the photons have been red-shifted from visible light to radio waves (microwave radiation corresponding to a temperature of about 2.7 K). Red shifting describes the photons acquiring longer wavelengths and lower frequencies as the universe expanded over billions of years, so that they gradually changed from visible light to radio waves. These same photons can still be detected as radio waves today. They form the cosmic microwave background, and they provide crucial evidence of the early universe and how it developed.

Around the same time as recombination, existing pressure waves within the electron-baryon plasma—known as baryon acoustic oscillations—became embedded in the distribution of matter as it condensed, giving rise to a very slight preference in distribution of large-scale objects. Therefore, the cosmic microwave background is a picture of the universe at the end of this epoch including the tiny fluctuations generated during inflation (see 9-year WMAP image), and the spread of objects such as galaxies in the universe is an indication of the scale and size of the universe as it developed over time.

== Gravity builds cosmic structure ==
370 thousand to about 1 billion years after inflation

Even before recombination and decoupling, matter began to accumulate around clumps of dark matter. Clouds of hydrogen collapsed very slowly to form stars and galaxies.

Hubble Space Telescope—Ultra Deep Field galaxies to Legacy Field zoom out (video 00:50; 2 May 2019)

=== Dark Ages ===
After recombination and decoupling, the universe was transparent and had cooled enough to allow light to travel long distances, but there were no light-producing structures such as stars and galaxies. Stars and galaxies are formed when dense regions of gas form due to the action of gravity, and this takes a long time within a near-uniform density of gas and on the scale required, so it is estimated that stars did not exist for perhaps hundreds of millions of years after recombination.

This period, known as the Dark Ages, began at photon decoupling around 370,000 years after inflation and ends over a long period of time called reionization. During the Dark Ages, the temperature of the universe cooled from some 4000 K to about 60 K (3727 °C to about −213 °C), and only two sources of photons existed: the photons released during recombination/decoupling (as neutral hydrogen atoms formed), which is still detectable today as the cosmic microwave background (CMB), and photons occasionally released by neutral hydrogen atoms, known as the 21 cm spin line of neutral hydrogen. The hydrogen spin line is in the microwave range of frequencies, and within 3 million years, the CMB photons had redshifted out of visible light to infrared; from that time until the first stars, there were no visible light photons. Other than perhaps some rare statistical anomalies, the universe was truly dark.

The first generation of stars, known as Population III stars, formed within a few hundred million years after the inflation. These stars were the first source of visible light in the universe after recombination. Structures may have begun to emerge from around 150 million years, and early galaxies emerged from around 180 to 700 million years. As they emerged, the Dark Ages gradually ended. Because this process was gradual, the Dark Ages only ended fully at around 1 billion years, as the universe took on its present appearance.

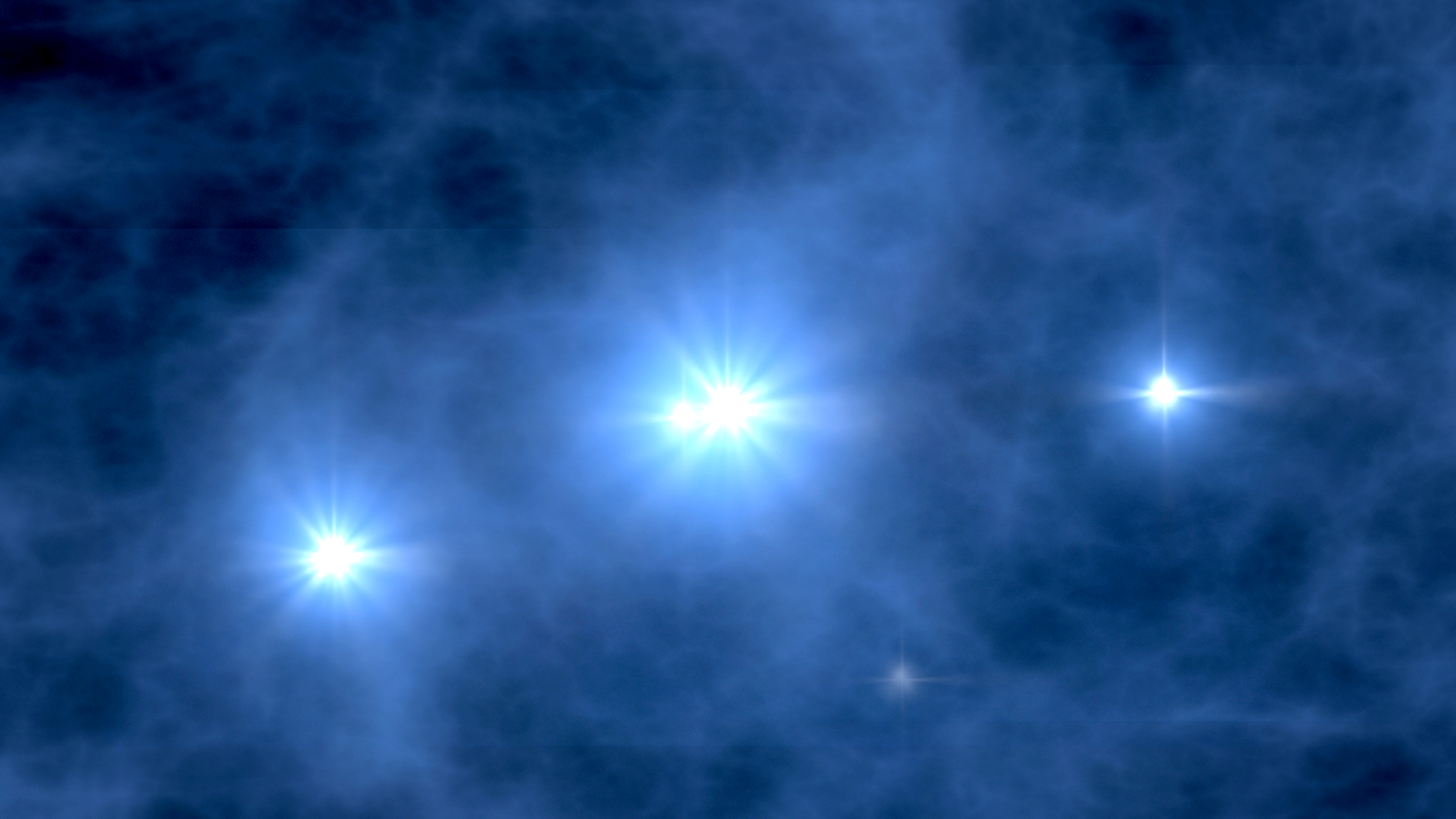
Artist's impression of the first stars, 400 million years after the Big Bang

==== Oldest observations of stars and galaxies ====
At present, the oldest observations of stars and galaxies are from shortly after the start of reionization, with galaxies such as GN-z11 (Hubble Space Telescope, 2016) at about z≈11.1 (about 400 million years cosmic time). Hubble's successor, the James Webb Space Telescope, launched December 2021, is designed to detect objects up to 100 times fainter than Hubble, and much earlier in the history of the universe, back to redshift z≈20 (about 180 million years cosmic time). This is believed to be earlier than the first galaxies, and around the era of the first stars.

There is also an observational effort underway to detect the faint 21 cm spin line radiation, as it is in principle an even more powerful tool than the cosmic microwave background for studying the early universe.

=== Earliest structures and stars emerge ===
Around 150 million to 1 billion years after the inflation

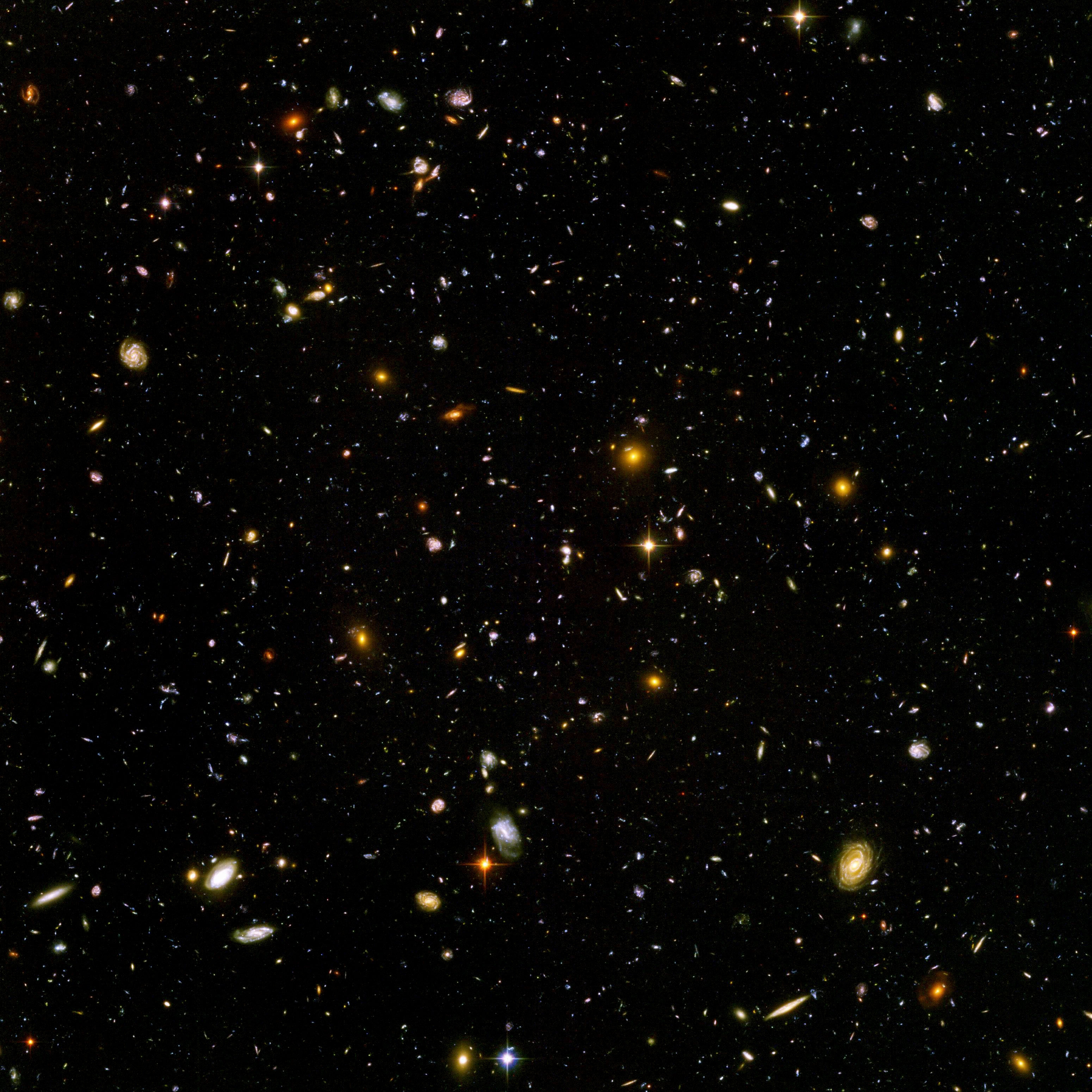
The Hubble Ultra Deep Fields often feature galaxies that are examples of what the early Stelliferous Era was like.

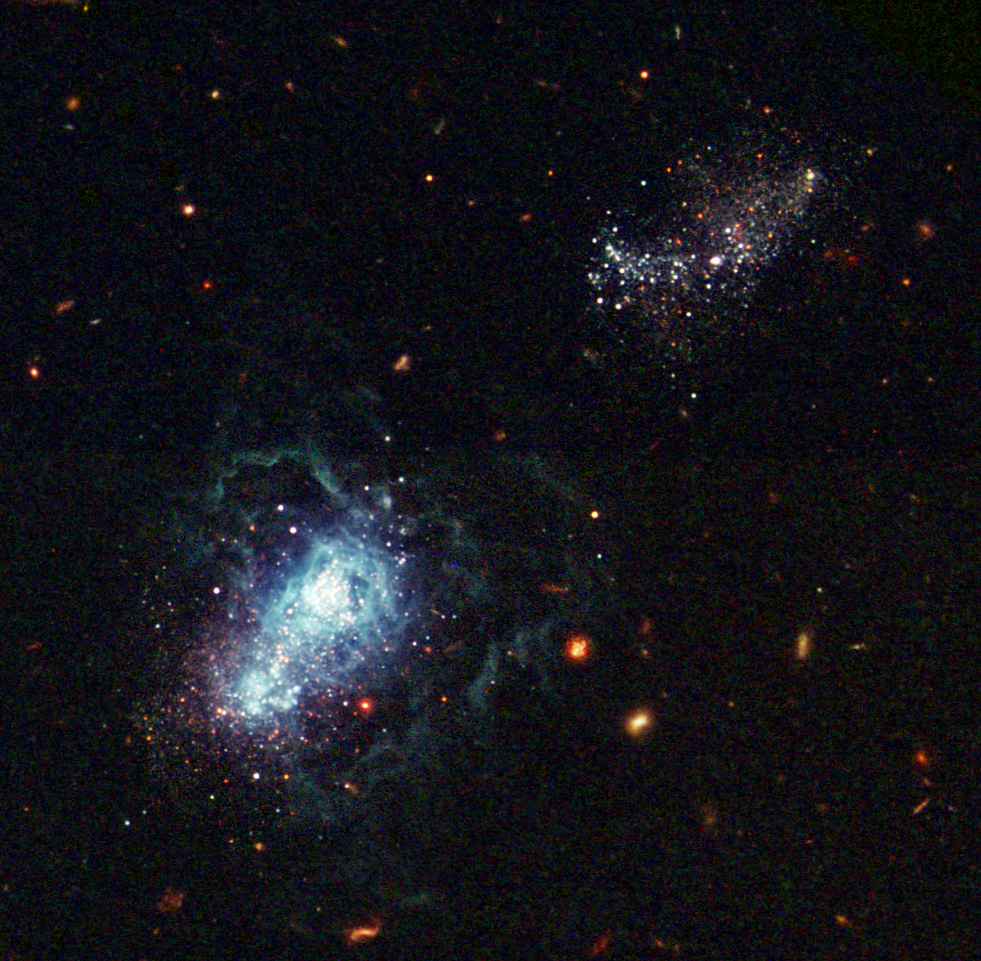
Another Hubble image shows an infant galaxy forming nearby, which means this happened very recently on the cosmological timescale. This shows that new galaxy formation in the universe is still occurring.

The matter in the universe is around 84.5% cold dark matter and 15.5% "ordinary" matter. Since the start of the matter-dominated era, dark matter has gradually been gathering in huge spread-out (diffuse) filaments under the effects of gravity. Ordinary matter eventually gathers together faster than it would otherwise, because of the presence of these concentrations of dark matter. It is also slightly more dense at regular distances due to early baryon acoustic oscillations (BAO) which became embedded into the distribution of matter when photons decoupled. Unlike dark matter, ordinary matter can lose energy by many routes, which means that as it collapses, it can lose the energy which would otherwise hold it apart, and collapse more quickly, and into denser forms. Ordinary matter gathers where dark matter is denser, and in those places it collapses into clouds of mainly hydrogen gas. The first stars and galaxies form from these clouds. Where numerous galaxies have formed, galaxy clusters and superclusters will eventually arise. Large voids with few stars will develop between them, marking where dark matter became less common.

The exact timings of the first stars, galaxies, supermassive black holes, and quasars, and the start and end timings and progression of the period known as reionization, are still being actively researched, with new findings published periodically. As of 2019, the earliest confirmed galaxies (for example GN-z11) date from around 380–400 million years, suggesting surprisingly fast gas cloud condensation and stellar birth rates. Observations of the Lyman-alpha forest, and of other changes to the light from ancient objects, allow the timing for reionization and its eventual end to be narrowed down.

Structure formation in the Big Bang model proceeds hierarchically, due to gravitational collapse, with smaller structures forming before larger ones. The earliest structures to form are the first stars (known as Population III stars), dwarf galaxies, and quasars (which are thought to be bright, early active galaxies containing a supermassive black hole surrounded by an inward-spiraling accretion disk of gas). Before this epoch, the evolution of the universe could be understood through linear cosmological perturbation theory: that is, all structures could be understood as small deviations from a perfect homogeneous universe. This is computationally relatively easy to study. At this point non-linear structures begin to form, and the computational problem becomes much more difficult, involving, for example, N-body simulations with billions of particles. The Bolshoi cosmological simulation is a high precision simulation of this era.

These Population III stars are also responsible for turning the few light elements that were formed in the Big Bang (hydrogen, helium and small amounts of lithium) into many heavier elements. They can be huge as well as perhaps small—and non-metallic (no elements except hydrogen and helium). The larger stars have very short lifetimes compared to most Main Sequence stars seen today, so they commonly finish burning their hydrogen fuel and explode as supernovae after mere millions of years, seeding the universe with heavier elements over repeated generations. They mark the start of the Stelliferous Era.

As yet, no Population III stars have been found, so the understanding of them is based on computational models of their formation and evolution. Fortunately, observations of the cosmic microwave background radiation can be used to date when star formation began in earnest. Analysis of such observations made by the Planck microwave space telescope in 2016 concluded that the first generation of stars may have formed from around 300 million years after inflation.

Quasars provide some additional evidence of early structure formation. Their light shows evidence of elements such as carbon, magnesium, iron and oxygen. This is evidence that by the time quasars formed, a massive phase of star formation had already taken place, including sufficient generations of Population III stars to give rise to these elements.

=== Reionization ===
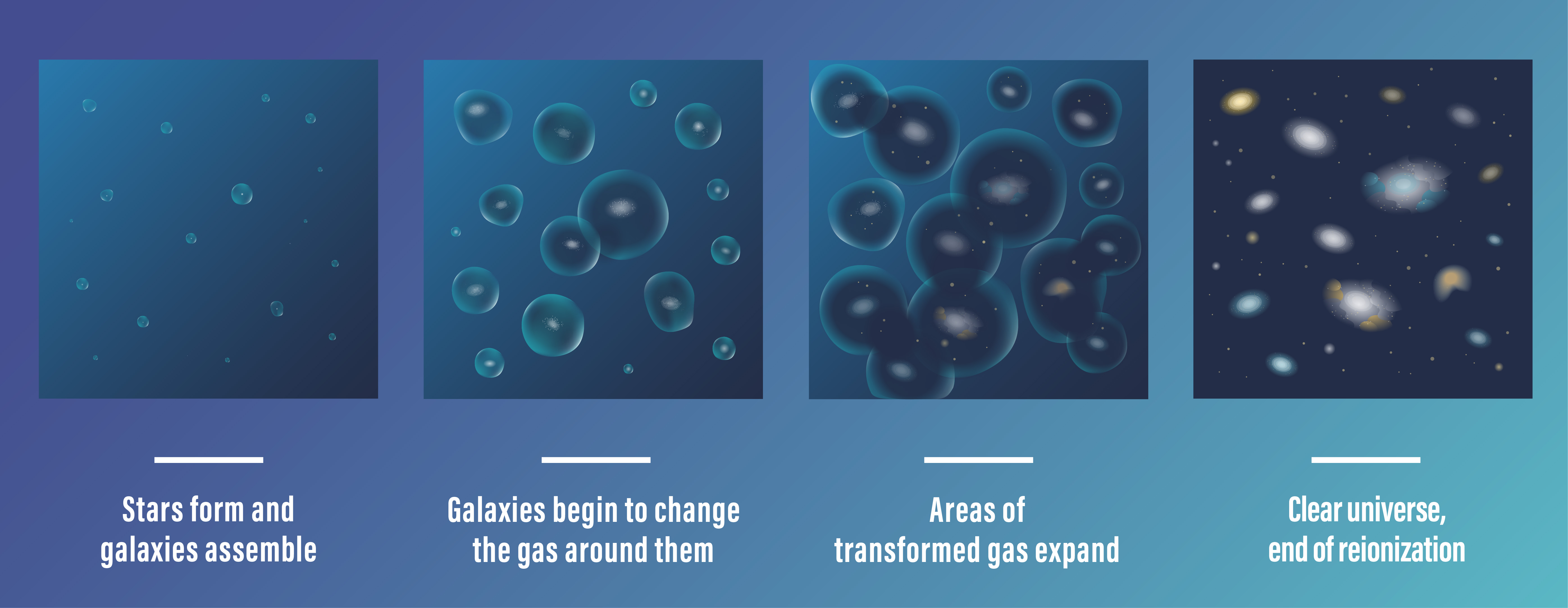
Phases of the reionization

As the first stars, dwarf galaxies and quasars gradually form, the intense radiation they emit reionizes much of the surrounding universe, splitting the neutral hydrogen atoms back into a plasma of free electrons and protons for the first time since recombination and decoupling.

Reionization is evidenced from observations of quasars. Quasars are a form of active galaxy, and the most luminous objects observed in the universe. Electrons in neutral hydrogen have specific patterns of absorbing ultraviolet photons, related to electron energy levels and called the Lyman series. Ionized hydrogen does not have electron energy levels of this kind. Therefore, light travelling through ionized hydrogen and neutral hydrogen shows different absorption lines. Ionized hydrogen in the intergalactic medium (particularly electrons) can scatter light through Thomson scattering as it did before recombination, but the expansion of the universe and clumping of gas into galaxies resulted in a concentration too low to make the universe fully opaque by the time of reionization. Because of the immense distance travelled by light (billions of light years) to reach Earth from structures existing during reionization, any absorption by neutral hydrogen is redshifted by various amounts, rather than by one specific amount, indicating when the absorption of then-ultraviolet light happened. These features make it possible to study the state of ionization at many different times in the past.

Reionization began as "bubbles" of ionized hydrogen which became larger over time until the entire intergalactic medium was ionized, when the absorption lines by neutral hydrogen become rare. The absorption was due to the general state of the universe (the intergalactic medium) and not due to passing through galaxies or other dense areas. Reionization might have started to happen as early as z = 16 (250 million years of cosmic time) and was mostly complete by around z = 9 or 10 (500 million years), with the remaining neutral hydrogen becoming fully ionized z = 5 or 6 (1 billion years), when Gunn-Peterson troughs that show the presence of large amounts of neutral hydrogen disappear. The intergalactic medium remains predominantly ionized to the present day, the exception being some remaining neutral hydrogen clouds, which cause Lyman-alpha forests to appear in spectra.

These observations have narrowed down the period of time during which reionization took place, but the source of the photons that caused reionization is still not completely certain. To ionize neutral hydrogen, an energy larger than 13.6 eV is required, which corresponds to ultraviolet photons with a wavelength of 91.2 nm or shorter, implying that the sources must have produced significant amounts of ultraviolet and higher energy. Protons and electrons will recombine if energy is not continuously provided to keep them apart, which also sets limits on how numerous the sources were and their longevity. With these constraints, it is expected that quasars and first generation stars and galaxies were the main sources of energy. The current leading candidates from most to least significant are currently believed to be Population III stars (the earliest stars; possibly 70%), dwarf galaxies (very early small high-energy galaxies; possibly 30%), and a contribution from quasars (a class of active galactic nuclei).

However, by this time, matter had become far more spread out due to the ongoing expansion of the universe. Although the neutral hydrogen atoms were again ionized, the plasma was much more thin and diffuse, and photons were much less likely to be scattered. Despite being reionized, the universe remained largely transparent during reionization due to how sparse the intergalactic medium was. Reionization gradually ended as the intergalactic medium became virtually completely ionized, although some regions of neutral hydrogen do exist, creating Lyman-alpha forests.

In August 2023, images of black holes and related matter in the very early universe by the James Webb Space Telescope were reported and discussed.

=== Galaxies, clusters and superclusters ===
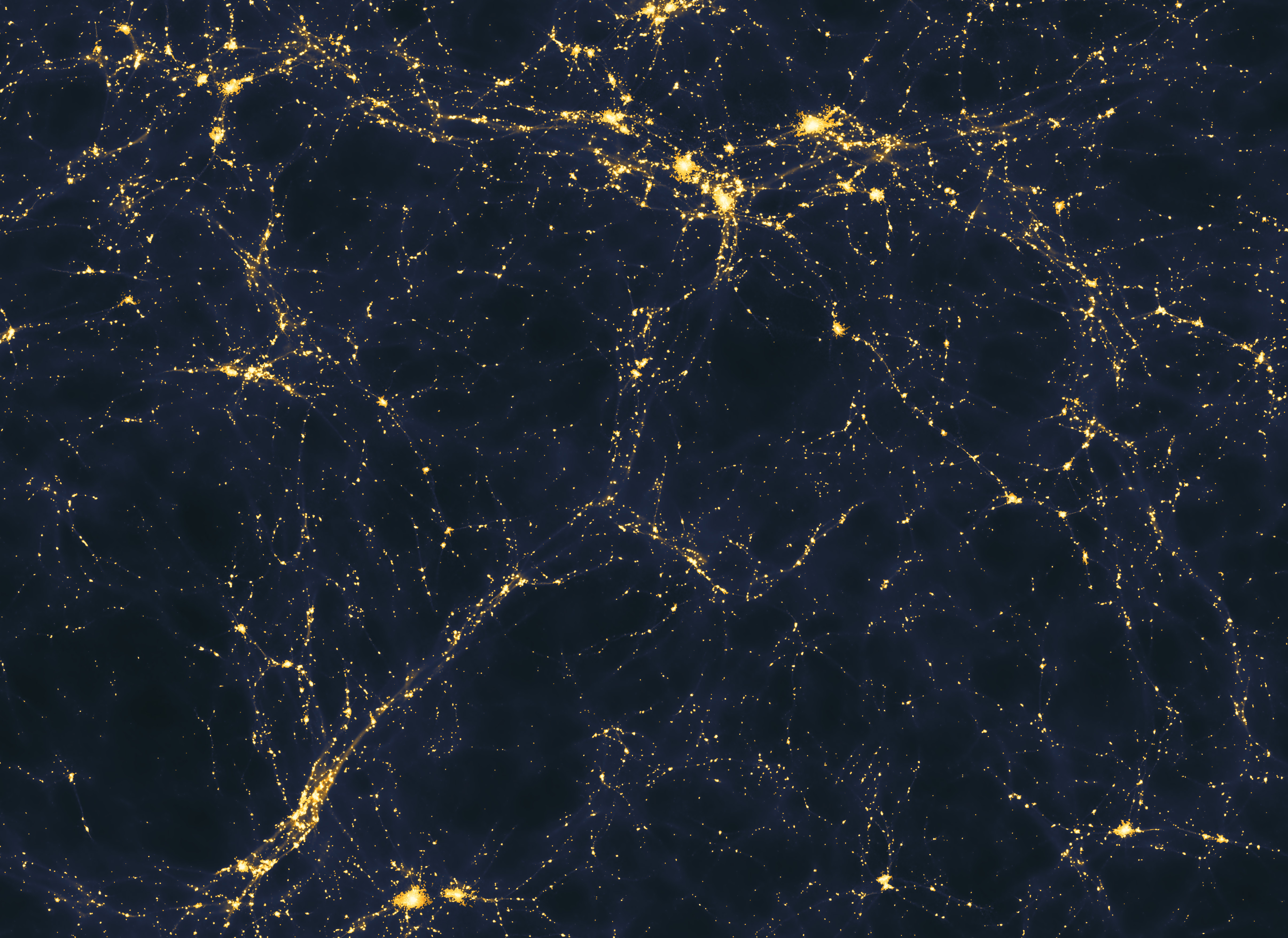
Computer simulated view of the large-scale structure of a part of the universe about 50 million light-years across

Matter continues to draw together under the influence of gravity, forming galaxies. The stars from this time period, known as Population II stars, are formed early on in this process, with more recent Population I stars formed later. Gravitational attraction also gradually pulls galaxies towards each other to form groups, clusters and superclusters. Hubble Ultra Deep Field observations has identified a number of small galaxies merging to form larger ones at 800 million years of cosmic time (13 billion years ago). (This age estimate is now believed to be slightly overstated.)

== Present and future ==
Nature timeline
← / Earliest stars; ← / Earliest galaxy; ← / Earliest quasar / black hole; ← / Omega Centauri; ← / Andromeda Galaxy; ← / Milky Way spirals; ← / NGC 188 star cluster; ← / Alpha Centauri; ← / Accelerated expansion; ← / Earth / Solar System; ← / Earliest known life; ← / Atmospheric oxygen; ← / Sexual reproduction; ← / Earliest fungi; ← / Earliest land plants; ← / Cambrian explosion; ← / Earliest mammals; ← / Earliest apes / humans
(billion years ago)

=== Universe as it appears today ===
From 1 billion years, and for about 12.8 billion years, the universe has looked much as it does today and it will continue to appear very similar for many billions of years into the future. The thin disk of the Milky Way began to form when the universe was about 5 billion years old or 9 ± 2 Gya. The Solar System formed at about 9.2 billion years (4.6 Gya); the oldest organic matter consistent with life processes dates back 4 billion years.

The thinning of matter over time reduces the ability of the matter to gravitationally decelerate the expansion of the universe; in contrast, dark energy is a constant factor tending to accelerate the expansion of the universe. The universe's expansion passed an inflection point about five or six billion years ago when the universe entered the modern "dark-energy-dominated era" where the universe's expansion is now accelerating rather than decelerating. The present-day universe is quite well understood, but beyond about 100 billion years of cosmic time (about 86 billion years in the future), scientists are less sure which path the universe will take.

=== Dark energy–dominated era ===
From about 9.8 billion years after inflation

From about 9.8 billion years of cosmic time, the universe's large-scale behavior is believed to have gradually changed for the third time in its history. Its behavior had originally been dominated by radiation (relativistic constituents such as photons and neutrinos) for the first 47,000 years, and since about 370,000 years of cosmic time, its behavior had been dominated by matter. During its matter-dominated era, the expansion of the universe had begun to slow down, as gravity reined in the initial outward expansion. But from about 9.8 billion years of cosmic time, observations show that the expansion of the universe slowly stops decelerating, and gradually begins to accelerate again, instead.

While the precise cause is not known, the observation is accepted as correct by the cosmologist community. By far the most accepted understanding is that this is due to an unknown form of energy which has been given the name "dark energy". "Dark" in this context means that it is not directly observed, but its existence can be deduced by examining the gravitational effect it has on the universe. Research is ongoing to understand this dark energy. Dark energy is now believed to be the single largest component of the universe, as it constitutes about 68.3% of the entire mass–energy of the physical universe.

Dark energy is believed to act like a cosmological constant—a scalar field that exists throughout space. Unlike gravity, the effects of such a field do not diminish (or only diminish slowly) as the universe grows. While matter and gravity have a greater effect initially, their effect quickly diminishes as the universe continues to expand. Objects in the universe, which are initially seen to be moving apart as the universe expands, continue to move apart, but their outward motion gradually slows down. This slowing effect becomes smaller as the universe becomes more spread out. Eventually, the outward and repulsive effect of dark energy begins to dominate over the inward pull of gravity. Instead of slowing down and perhaps beginning to move inward under the influence of gravity, from about 9.8 billion years of cosmic time, the expansion of space starts to slowly accelerate outward at a gradually increasing rate.

== Beyond standard cosmology ==
=== Cosmogenesis ===
Using known and proposed laws of physics, it is possible to speculate about what came before the inflationary epoch and the origin of the universe.

==== Singularity ====
The universe before the onset of inflation may have originated from a singularity, which often arises when extrapolating cosmological models backwards in time using classical general relativity. However, before reaching the Big Bang singularity, quantum effects become important. To understand if there existed such a singularity, one must first develop a theory of quantum gravity.

==== Planck epoch ====
The universe before inflation may have been very hot. If this is extrapolated backwards in time, the universe became hotter and dense earlier on. The epoch where temperatures and densities were above the Planck scale is known as the Planck epoch. Here quantum gravity becomes important and the known laws of physics break down. The energy of particles in this epoch is so large that quantum effects take over from classical equations for gravity.

=== Grand unification epoch ===
After the Planck era, the universe could have entered a grand unification epoch, where it is modeled by extensions of the Standard Model of particle physics, known as grand unified theories. Many such theories have been proposed, but none have been successfully verified. During the GUT epoch, the temperature of the universe exceeded 10^{15} GeV. As the universe expanded and cooled, it may have crossed a cosmological phase transition. This phase transition is a thermodynamic effect similar to condensation of a gas or freezing of a liquid.

=== Far future and ultimate fate ===
There are several competing scenarios for the long-term evolution of the universe. Which of them will happen, if any, depends on the precise values of physical constants such as the cosmological constant, the possibility of proton decay, the energy of the vacuum (meaning, the energy of "empty" space itself), and the natural laws beyond the Standard Model.

If the expansion of the universe continues and it stays in its present form, eventually all but the nearest galaxies will be carried away from the Earth by the expansion of space at such a velocity that the observable universe will be limited to the solar system's gravitationally bound local galaxy cluster, the Laniakea Supercluster. In the very long term (after many trillions—thousands of billions—of years, cosmic time), the Stelliferous Era will end, as stars cease to be born and even the longest-lived stars gradually die. Beyond this, all objects in the universe will cool and (with the possible exception of protons) gradually decompose back to their constituent particles and then into subatomic particles and very low-level photons and other fundamental particles, by a variety of possible processes.

The following scenarios have been proposed for the ultimate fate of the universe:

Scenario		Description
Heat death	As expansion continues, the universe becomes larger, colder, and more dilute; in time, all structures eventually decompose to subatomic particles and photons.	In the case of indefinitely continuing cosmic expansion, the energy density in the universe will decrease until, after an estimated time of 10^{1000} years, it reaches thermodynamic equilibrium and no more structure will be possible. This will happen only after an extremely long time because first, some (less than 0.1%) matter will collapse into black holes, which will then evaporate extremely slowly via Hawking radiation. The universe in this scenario will cease to be able to support life much earlier than this, after some 10^{14} years or so, when star formation ceases.^{, §IID} In some Grand Unified Theories, proton decay after at least 10^{34} years will convert the remaining interstellar gas and stellar remnants into leptons (such as positrons and electrons) and photons. Some positrons and electrons will then recombine into photons.^{, §IV, §VF} In this case, the universe has reached a high-entropy state consisting of a bath of particles and low-energy radiation. It is not known, however, whether it eventually achieves thermodynamic equilibrium.^{, §VIB, VID} The hypothesis of a universal heat death stems from the 1850s ideas of William Thomson (Lord Kelvin), who extrapolated the classical theory of heat and irreversibility (as embodied in the first two laws of thermodynamics) to the universe as a whole.
Big Rip	Expansion of space accelerates and at some point becomes so extreme that even subatomic particles and the fabric of spacetime are pulled apart and unable to exist.	For any value of the dark energy content of the universe where the negative pressure ratio is less than −1, the expansion rate of the universe will continue to increase without limit. Gravitationally bound systems, such as clusters of galaxies, galaxies, and ultimately the Solar System will be torn apart. Eventually the expansion will be so rapid as to overcome the electromagnetic forces holding molecules and atoms together. Even atomic nuclei will be torn apart. Finally, forces and interactions even on the Planck scale—the smallest size for which the notion of "space" currently has a meaning—will no longer be able to occur as the fabric of spacetime itself is pulled apart and the universe as it is known today will end in an unusual kind of singularity.
Big Crunch	Expansion eventually slows and halts, then reverses as all matter accelerates towards its common centre. Currently considered to be likely incorrect.	In the opposite of the "Big Rip" scenario, the expansion of the universe would at some point be reversed and the universe would contract towards a hot, dense state. This is a required element of oscillatory universe scenarios, such as the cyclic model, although a Big Crunch does not necessarily imply an oscillatory universe. Current observations suggest that this model of the universe is unlikely to be correct, and the expansion will continue or even accelerate.
Vacuum instability	Collapse of the quantum fields that underpin all forces, particles and structures, to a different form.	Cosmology traditionally has assumed a stable or at least metastable universe, but the possibility of a false vacuum in quantum field theory implies that the universe at any point in spacetime might spontaneously collapse into a lower-energy state (see Bubble nucleation), a more stable or "true vacuum", which would then expand outward from that point with the speed of light.

In this kind of protracted timescale, extremely rare quantum phenomena may also occur that are unlikely to be seen on a timescale smaller than trillions of years. These may also lead to unpredictable changes to the state of the universe which would not be likely to be significant on any smaller timescale. For example, on a timescale of millions of trillions of years, black holes might appear to evaporate almost instantly, uncommon quantum tunnelling phenomena would appear to be common, and quantum (or other) phenomena so unlikely that they might occur just once in a trillion years may occur many times.

== See also ==
- Age of the universe – Cosmological time duration
- Big History – Academic discipline that examines history from the Big Bang to the present day
- Cosmic Calendar – Method to visualize the chronology of the universe (age of the universe scaled to a single year)
- Cyclic model – Cosmological models involving indefinite, self-sustaining cycles
- Dark energy–dominated era – Expansion of the universe parameter
- Dyson's eternal intelligence – Hypothetical concept in astrophysics
- Entropy as an arrow of time – Use of the second law of thermodynamics to distinguish past from future
- Illustris project – Computer-simulated universes
- Matter-dominated era – Expansion of the universe parameter
- Radiation-dominated era – Expansion of the universe parameter
- Timeline of the far future – Scientific projections regarding the far future
- Ultimate fate of the universe – Theories about the end of the universe
