= Richard Conn Henry =

Professor, academic and author (born 1940)

Richard Conn Henry (born 7 March 1940) is an Academy Professor of Physics and Astronomy at Johns Hopkins University, author of one book and over 200 publications on the topics of astrophysics and various forms of astronomy including optical, radio, ultraviolet, and X-ray. He reports being part of a team that discovered "vastly more baryons than had ever before been found in the universe". He is also cited in the effort to recategorize Pluto as a dwarf planet.

He initially joined the Johns Hopkins University Physics Department in 1968 as the first JHU astronomer since 1908. After a stint at NASA, he returned to help attract in 1981 the Space Telescope Science Institute to JHU, an organization that now employs 500, including 100 PhDs.

More recently he has attracted popular press for the SETI ecliptic search idea and the Hanke–Henry Permanent Calendar. The SETI ecliptic search idea suggests focusing SETI efforts in the ecliptic plane in which distant hypothetical observers can see the Earth's transit of the sun. The Hanke–Henry Permanent Calendar is one in which the number of days in a year is always divisible by seven, such that holidays always fall on the same day of the week. Most years have only four quarters of 91 days, while every five or six years an extra week is inserted at the end of December.

He is also active in various organizations, including the Streit Council, where as of 2012 he is president; the Maryland Space Grant Consortium; and an organization he founded, the Henry Foundation, which "sponsors improved worldwide understanding of physics". He earned a Ph.D. from Princeton University in 1967.

He is cited for providing, for black holes that are rotating, and/or are electrically charged, the Kretschmann scalar, which characterizes their degree of curvature. He is also known for writing the paper The mental Universe, where he asserts the mental nature of reality itself.
