= Paul R. Shapiro =

Paul Robert Shapiro is an American astrophysicist.

Shapiro earned a bachelor's degree and doctorate from Harvard University, in 1974 and 1978, respectively, and began teaching at the University of Texas at Austin in 1981, after completing postdoctoral research at the Institute for Advanced Study. In 2006, he was appointed to the Frank N. Edmonds, Jr. Regents Professorship in Astronomy. Shapiro was elected a fellow of the American Physical Society in 2010, "[f]or outstanding contributions to astrophysics and cosmology which advanced our understanding of cosmic reionization, structure formation, gas dynamics, dark matter and dark energy, the interstellar and intergalactic media, and topics from supernova polarization to relativistic shocks."
