= Richard Klein (astronomer) =

American astronomer

- Education: Bachelor's Degree(Physics); Pensselaer Polytechnic Institute (1966) PhD(Physics) Brandeis University (1973).
- Occupation: Adjunct Professor of Astronomy
- Employer: University of California
- Title: Professor

Richard Klein is an adjunct professor of Astronomy at the University of California, Berkeley and a Scientific Staff Member at the Lawrence Livermore National Laboratory (LLNL). Klein received his bachelor's degree in physics from Rensselaer Polytechnic Institute in 1966 and his PhD in physics from Brandeis University in 1973.

Klein has pioneered methods of radiative transfer and adaptive mesh refinement applied to computational astrophysics over the last several decades. He played a central role in the development of the radiation-driven implosion model for induced star formation and in developing the leading theory of stellar winds for "hot stars". He has pursued a broad range of problems ranging from star formation to high energy physics, including the interactions of supernovae shocks with interstellar clouds, the formation of low and high mass stars, accretion onto neutron stars, and Compton-heated winds from accretion disks. He established the Berkeley Astrophysical Fluid Dynamics Group with Christopher McKee to develop the technique of adaptive mesh refinement for numerical simulations of astrophysical fluid dynamics. In addition, he has applied these simulations to scaled laboratory astrophysics experiments. He was recognized by fellowships in both the American Physical Society (APS) in 2003 and the American Astronomical Society in 2021 for his contributions to computational astrophysics.
