= Cosmic neutrino background =

Universe's background particle radiation composed of neutrinos

The cosmic neutrino background is a proposed background particle radiation composed of neutrinos. They are sometimes known as relic neutrinos or sometimes abbreviated CNB or CνB, where the symbol ν is the Greek letter nu, standard particle physics symbol for a neutrino.

The CνB is a relic of the Big Bang; while the cosmic microwave background radiation (CMB) dates from when the universe was 379,000 years old, the CνB decoupled (separated) from matter when the universe was just one second old. It is estimated that today, the CνB has a temperature of roughly 1.95 K.

As neutrinos rarely interact with matter, these neutrinos still exist today. They have a very low energy, around 10^{−4} to 10^{−6} eV. (Note: "Cosmic neutrinos detected, confirming the Big Bang's last great prediction". Forbes. Starts with a Bang. 9 September 2016. Above is news coverage of the original academic paper:) Even high energy neutrinos are notoriously difficult to detect, and the CνB has energies around 10^{10} times smaller, so the CνB may not be directly observed in detail for many years, if at all. However, Big Bang cosmology makes many predictions about the CνB, and there is very strong indirect evidence that the CνB exists.

== Origin ==
The early universe consisted of a very hot dense plasma which was expanding and thus cooling. Particles in the plasma collided and reacted, maintaining an equilibrium according to the possible reactions. Around 1 s after the Big Bang, the equilibrium among electrons, positrons, and neutrinos was disrupted. Several annihilation reactions like $\text{e}^- + \text{e}^+ \longleftrightarrow \nu_\text{e} + \bar{\nu}_\text{e}$ stopped because expansion left the neutrinos too far apart on average to find each other. The neutrinos are said to be decoupled. Rather than colliding and reacting, they kept going, a state known as free streaming. Since the universe was almost perfectly homogeneous plasma, this decoupling happened throughout the universe at the same time. These neutrinos have been traveling in an ever expanding universe for over 13 billion years. Although vast in number their characteristic temperature is very low.

== Temperature estimation ==
While the temperature of the cosmic neutrino background (CνB) cannot be directly measured, it can be estimated from the measured temperature of the cosmic microwave background (CMB) and physics of the early universe. The neutrinos and the photons were once at thermal equilibrium. The neutrinos decoupled first but before the photons decoupled, electrons and positrons in the hot plasma annihilated, meaning they combined, producing more photons and raising the temperature. Conservation of entropy allows the heating of the photons by the annihilation event to be estimated.

The entropy of each particle in an equilibrium mixture is proportional to its effective number of degrees of freedom, g:

$$\ s_i\ \propto\ g_i\ T^3\ ,$$

where T is the plasma or photon temperature. The factor $\ g_i\$ for the particle species engaged in the original equilibrium reaction:

+2 for each photon (or other massless bosons, if any),
+ 7 / 4 for each electron, positron, or other fermion.

The sum of all particle entropies, $\ \textstyle{\sum}_i\ g_i\ T^3\$ is conserved. Annihilation converts the entropy of photons, electrons, and positrons into entropy of photons alone:
$$\ \frac{~ s_\gamma + s_{\text{e}^-} + s_{\text{e}^+}\ }{ s_\gamma } = \left( \frac{\ 2 + \tfrac{7}{4} + \tfrac{7}{4}\ }{ 2 } \right) = \frac{ 11 }{\ 4\ }$$
Consequently the photons will be hotter than the neutrinos that decoupled earlier by the cube root of the ratio $\ \tfrac{~ T_\gamma\ }{\ T_\nu }\ :$

$$\ \left( \frac{~ T_\gamma\ }{\ T_\nu }\right)^{ \tfrac{ 1 }{ 3 } }\  =\ \left(\frac{ 11 }{\ 4\ } \right)^{ \tfrac{ 1 }{ 3 } }\ \approx\ 1.40102 ~$$

Since the cosmic photon background temperature at present has cooled to $\ T_\gamma = 2.725~\mathsf{K}\ ,$ it follows that the neutrino background temperature is currently

$$\ T_\nu \approx 1.95~\mathsf{K} ~.$$

The above discussion is only technically valid for massless neutrinos, which are always relativistic. For neutrinos with a non-zero rest mass, at low temperature where the neutrinos become non-relativistic, so a description in terms of a temperature for relic neutrinos' velocity is no longer appropriate, although the corresponding kinetic energy is correct. The context change happens when the neutrinos' thermal energy $\ \tfrac{ 3 }{ 2 }\ k\ T_\nu\$ (k is the Boltzmann constant) falls below their rest mass energy $\ m_\nu c^2\ ;$ in a low-temperature case one should instead speak of the neutrinos' collective energy density, which remains both relevant and well-defined.

== Indirect evidence ==
Relativistic neutrinos contribute to the radiation energy density of the universe ρ_{R}, typically parameterized in terms of the effective number of neutrino species N_{ν}:

$$\ \rho_\mathsf{R} =\ \frac{\ \pi^2 }{ 15 }\ T_\gamma^4\ (1 + z)^4 \left[\ 1 + \frac{7}{8} N_\nu \left( \frac{4}{11} \right)^{ \tfrac{4}{3} } \right]\ ,$$

where z denotes the redshift. The first term in the square brackets is due to the CMB, the second comes from the CνB. The Standard Model with its three neutrino species predicts a value of N_{ν} ≃ 3.046, including a small correction caused by a non-thermal distortion of the spectra during e^{+}–e^{−} annihilation. The radiation density had a major impact on various physical processes in the early universe, leaving potentially detectable imprints on measurable quantities, thus allowing us to infer the value of N_{ν} from observations.

=== Big Bang nucleosynthesis ===
Due to its effect on the expansion rate of the universe during Big Bang nucleosynthesis (BBN), the theoretical expectations for the primordial abundances of light elements depend on N_{ν} . Astrophysical measurements of the primordial ^{4}He and ^{2}D abundances lead to a value of N_{ν} = 3.14+0.70
−0.65 at 68% c.l., in very good agreement with the Standard Model expectation.

=== From the cosmic microwave background ===
==== Anisotropies and structure formation ====
The presence of the CνB affects the evolution of CMB anisotropies as well as the growth of matter perturbations in two ways: Due to its contribution to the radiation density of the universe (which determines for instance the time of matter–radiation equality), and due to the neutrinos' anisotropic stress which dampens the acoustic oscillations of the spectra. Additionally, free-streaming massive neutrinos suppress the growth of structure on small scales. The WMAP spacecraft's five-year data combined with type Ia supernova data and information about the baryon acoustic oscillation scale yielded N_{ν} = 4.34+0.88
−0.86 at 68% c.l., providing an independent confirmation of the BBN constraints. The Planck spacecraft collaboration has published the tightest bound to date on the effective number of neutrino species, at N_{ν} = 3.15±0.23.

==== Phase changes ====
Big Bang cosmology makes many predictions about the CνB, and there is very strong indirect evidence that the cosmic neutrino background exists, both from Big Bang nucleosynthesis predictions of the helium abundance, and from anisotropies in the cosmic microwave background. One of these predictions is that neutrinos will have left a subtle imprint on the cosmic microwave background (CMB). It is well known that the CMB has irregularities. Some of the CMB fluctuations were roughly regularly spaced, because of the effect of baryon acoustic oscillation. In theory, the decoupled neutrinos should have had a very slight effect on the phase of the various CMB fluctuations.

In 2015, it was reported that such shifts had been detected in the CMB. Moreover, the fluctuations corresponded to neutrinos of almost exactly the temperature predicted by Big Bang theory (1.96 ± 0.02 K compared to a prediction of 1.95 K), and exactly three types of neutrino, the same number of neutrino flavours currently predicted by the Standard Model.

== Prospects for the direct detection ==
Confirmation of the existence of these relic neutrinos may only be possible by directly detecting them using experiments on Earth. This will be difficult as the neutrinos which make up the CνB are non-relativistic, in addition to interacting only weakly with normal matter, and so any effect they have in a detector will be hard to identify. The neutrino interactions that are measured in current particle detectors are all with neutrinos newly created in the Sun, nuclear reactors, weapons, particle accelerators, cosmic ray collisions, and supernovas. Even among those, only the neutrinos with the highest kinetic energies are feasibly detectable. It is something of a "lose-lose" situation: The lower a neutrino's kinetic energy, the lower its probability of interacting with matter, and so then the even slighter, less noticeable will be the matter's response, even if some rare event were to occur.

One proposed method of direct detection of the CνB is to use the capture of cosmic relic neutrinos on tritium i.e. ^{3}H, leading to an induced form of beta decay.

The neutrinos of the CνB would lead to the production of electrons via the reaction

$$\nu + {}^3\text{H} \rightarrow {}^3\text{He} + \text{e}^-,$$

while the main background comes from electrons produced via natural beta decay

$${}^3\text{H} \rightarrow {}^3\text{He} + \text{e}^- + \bar\nu.$$

These electrons would be detected by the experimental apparatus in order to measure the size of the CνB. The latter source of electrons is far more numerous, however, their maximum energy is smaller than the average energy of the CνB-electrons by twice the average neutrino mass. Since this mass is tiny, of the order of a few electronvolts or less, such a detector must have an excellent energy resolution in order to separate the signal from the background. One such proposed experiment is called PTOLEMY at the Italian Laboratori Nazionali del Gran Sasso, which will be made up of 100 g of tritium target. The detector demonstrator (with about 1 $\mu$g of tritium on graphene) will be ready by 2027. The PTOLEMY demonstrator, will be sensitive to the neutrino mass.

== See also ==
- Cosmic background radiation
- Dark matter
- Diffuse supernova neutrino background
- Gravitational wave background
