= Free streaming =

Particles propagating through a medium without scattering

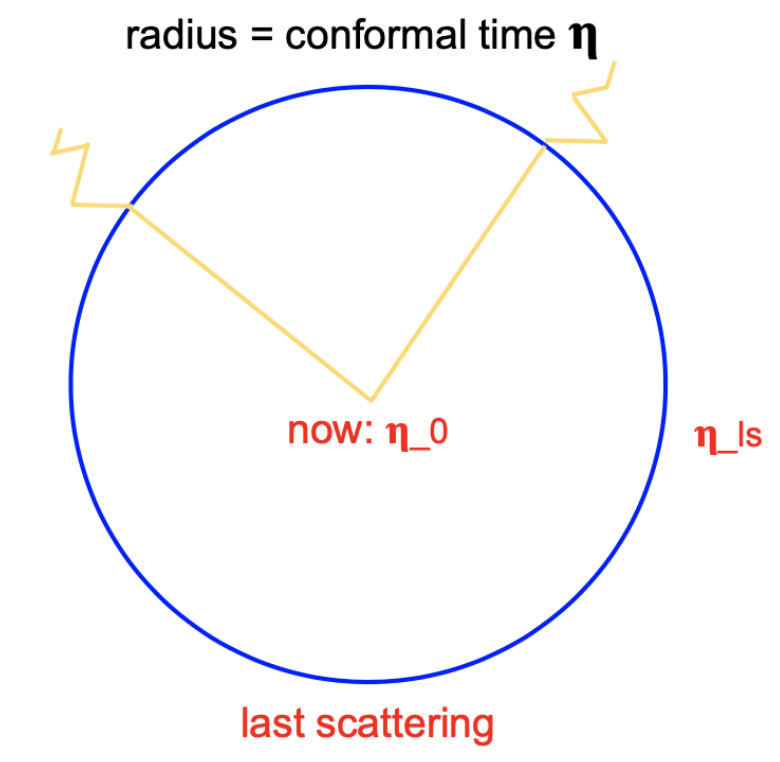
Diagram with blue circle representing the cosmic microwave background surface which the observer (at centre, at present time) observes at the time of last scattering. The yellow lines describe how photons were scattered before the epoch of recombination and were free-streaming after.

In astrophysics, free streaming is the motion of particles through a medium without scattering. Free streaming is often considered in the context of photons, but it is also relevant for neutrinos, cosmic rays, and hypothetical dark matter particles.

== Use in defining surfaces ==
Defining an exact surface for an object such as the Sun is made difficult by the diffuse nature of matter which constitutes the Sun at distances far from the stellar core. An often used definition for the surface of a star is based on the path that photons take. Inside a star, photons travel by random walk, constantly interacting with matter, and the surface of the star is defined as the point at which photons encounter little resistance from the matter in the stellar atmosphere, or in other words, when photons stream freely.

The light which constitutes the cosmic microwave background comes from the surface of last scattering. This is, on average, the surface at which primordial photons last interacted with matter in the universe, or in other words, the point at which photons started free streaming. Similarly, the surface of the cosmic neutrino background, if it could be observed, would mark when neutrinos decoupled and began to stream freely through the rest of the matter in the universe.

== See also ==
- Mean free path
- Knudsen gas
- Radiative transfer

== Bibliography ==
- Shu, Frank (1982). The Physical Universe: An Introduction to Astronomy. University Science Books. ISBN 978-0-935702-05-7.
