= Hydrogen line =

Spectral line of hydrogen state transition in UHF radio frequencies

A hydrogen atom with proton and electron spins aligned (top) undergoes a flip of the electron spin, resulting in emission of a photon with a 21 cm wavelength (bottom)

The hydrogen line, 21 centimeter line, or H I line (Note: The "I" in H I is a roman numeral, so it is pronounced "H one". It is also called the "neutral hydrogen" line, with the listener obliged to infer from context that "cold neutral hydrogen" at 1420.4 MHz or 0.211 m is meant.) is a spectral line that is created by a change in the energy state of solitary, electrically neutral hydrogen atoms. It is produced by a spin-flip transition, which means the direction of the electron's spin is reversed relative to the spin of the proton. This is a quantum state change between the two hyperfine levels of the hydrogen 1 s ground state. The electromagnetic radiation producing this line has a frequency of 1420.405751768(2) MHz (1.42 GHz), which is equivalent to a wavelength of 21.106114054160(30) cm in a vacuum. According to the Planck–Einstein relation E = hν, the photon emitted by this transition has an energy of 5.8743261841116(81) μeV [9.411708152678(13)×10^{−25} J]. The constant of proportionality, h, is known as the Planck constant.

The hydrogen line frequency lies in the L band, which is located in the lower end of the microwave region of the electromagnetic spectrum. It is frequently observed in radio astronomy because those radio waves can penetrate the large clouds of interstellar cosmic dust that are opaque to visible light. The existence of this line was predicted by Dutch astronomer H. van de Hulst in 1944, then directly observed by E. M. Purcell and his student H. I. Ewen in 1951. Observations of the hydrogen line have been used to reveal the spiral shape of the Milky Way, to calculate the mass and dynamics of individual galaxies, and to test for changes to the fine-structure constant over time. It is of particular importance to cosmology because it can be used to study the early Universe. Due to its fundamental properties, this line is of interest in the search for extraterrestrial intelligence. This line is the theoretical basis of the hydrogen maser.

== Cause ==
An atom of neutral hydrogen consists of an electron bound to a proton. The lowest stationary energy state of the bound electron is called its ground state. Both the electron and the proton have intrinsic magnetic dipole moments ascribed to their spin, whose interaction results in a slight increase in energy when the spins are parallel, and a decrease when antiparallel. The fact that only parallel and antiparallel states are allowed is a result of the quantum mechanical discretization of the total angular momentum of the system. When the spins are parallel, the magnetic dipole moments are antiparallel (because the electron and proton have opposite charge), thus one would expect this configuration to actually have lower energy just as two magnets will align so that the north pole of one is closest to the south pole of the other. This logic fails here because the wave functions of the electron and the proton overlap; that is, the electron is not spatially displaced from the proton, but encompasses it. The magnetic dipole moments are therefore best thought of as tiny current loops. As parallel currents attract, the parallel magnetic dipole moments (i.e., antiparallel spins) have lower energy.

In the ground state, the spin-flip transition between these aligned states has an energy difference of 5.87433 μeV. When applied to the Planck relation, this gives:

$$\lambda = \frac {1}{\nu} \cdot c = \frac {h}{E} \cdot c \approx \frac{\; 4.135\,67 \cdot 10^{-15} \ \mathrm{eV}\cdot\text{s} \;}{5.874\,33 \cdot 10^{-6}\ \mathrm{eV}}\, \cdot\, 2.997\,92 \cdot 10^8 \ \mathrm{m} \cdot \mathrm{s}^{-1} \approx 0.211\,06\ \mathrm{m} = 21.106\ \mathrm{cm}\;$$

where λ is the wavelength of an emitted photon, ν is its frequency, E is the photon energy, h is the Planck constant, and c is the speed of light in a vacuum. In a laboratory setting, the hydrogen line parameters have been more precisely measured as:

λ = 21.106114054160(30) cm
ν = 1420405751.768(2) Hz

in a vacuum.

The wavelength of this line can be expressed from the fundamental constants by the formula (in CGS system, without quantum corrections of second and higher orders):

$$\lambda = \frac{3 \pi \hbar^5 m_p c^3}{ g_e g_p m_e^2 e^8},$$

which in the SI corresponds to:

$$\lambda = \frac{3 \pi \hbar^5 m_p c^3 (4 \pi \varepsilon_0)^4}{ g_e g_p m_e^2 e^8} \approx 0.2107... m,$$

where $m_p$ — the mass of proton,

$m_e$ — the mass of electron,
$\hbar$ — the reduced Planck constant,
$g_e$ — the electron spin g-factor (≈2.00),
$g_p$ — the proton spin g-factor (≈5.59),
$e$ — the elementary charge,
$\varepsilon_0$ — the vacuum permittivity.

Because the decay involves a spin flip, it is forbidden by electric dipole transitions. It requires a magnetic dipole transition, which has an extremely small spontaneous transition rate of 2.9×10^{−15} s^{−1}, and a mean lifetime of the excited state of around 11 million years. Collisions of neutral hydrogen atoms with electrons or other atoms can help promote the emission of 21 cm photons. A spontaneous occurrence of the transition is unlikely to be seen in a laboratory on Earth, but it can be artificially induced through stimulated emission using a hydrogen maser. It is commonly observed in astronomical settings such as hydrogen clouds in our galaxy and others.

Because of the uncertainty principle, its long lifetime gives an energy uncertainty on the order of 10^{−30} eV. Compared to the value of 5.87433 μeV, it produces a spectral line with an extremely small natural width on the order of 10^{−25}, so most broadening is due to Doppler shifts caused by bulk motion or nonzero temperature of the emitting regions.

== Discovery ==
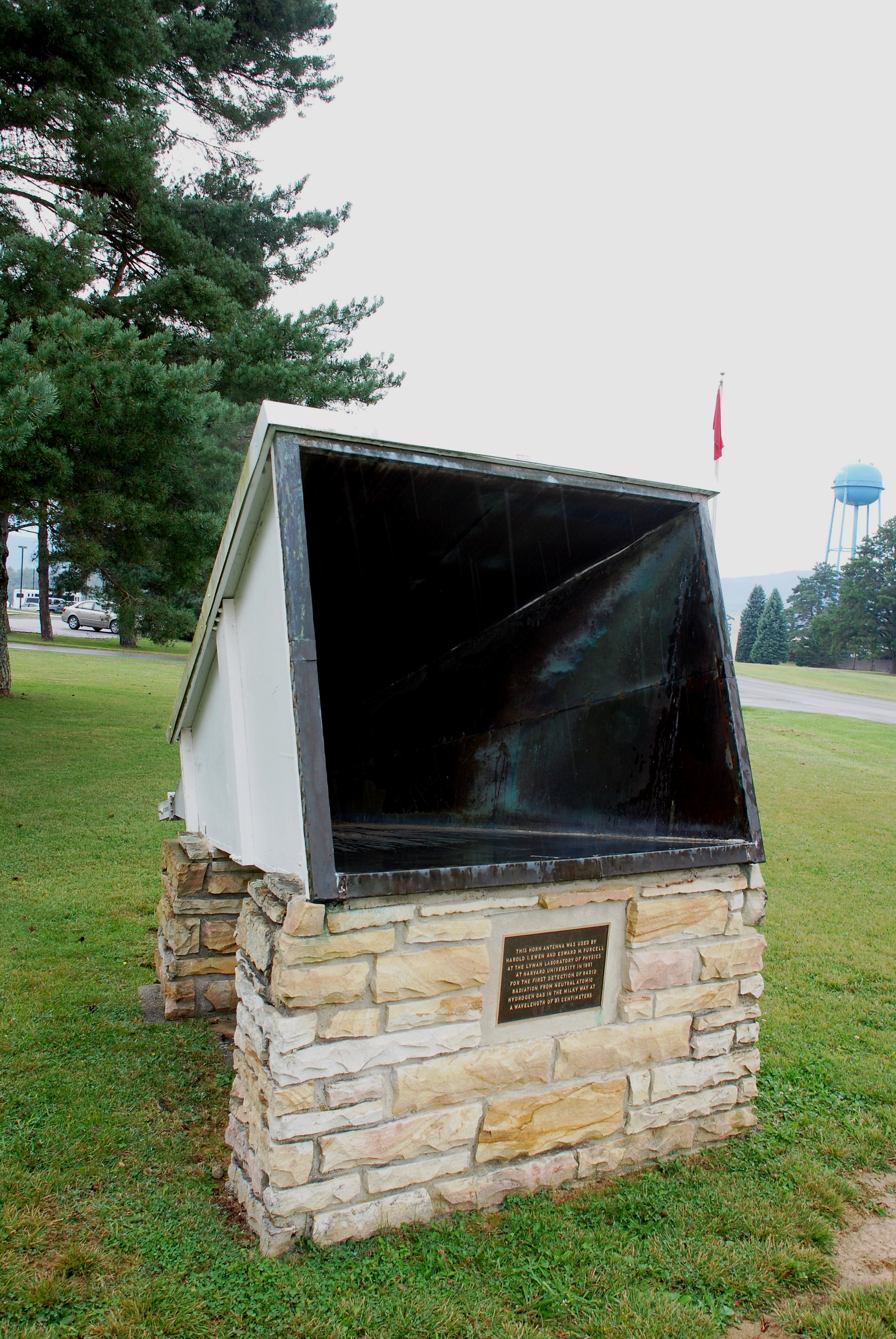
Horn antenna used by Ewen and Purcell for the first detection of hydrogen line emission from the Milky Way

During the 1930s, it was noticed that there was a radio "hiss" that varied on a daily cycle and appeared to be extraterrestrial in origin. After initial suggestions that this was due to the Sun, it was observed that the radio waves seemed to propagate from the Galactic Center. These discoveries were published in 1940 and were noted by Jan Oort who knew that significant advances could be made in astronomy if there were emission lines in the radio part of the spectrum. He referred this to Hendrik van de Hulst who, in 1944, predicted that neutral hydrogen could produce radiation at a frequency of 1420.4058 MHz due to two closely spaced energy levels in the ground state of the hydrogen atom.

The 21 cm line (1420.4 MHz) was first detected in 1951 by Ewen and Purcell at Harvard University, and published after their data was corroborated by Dutch astronomers Muller and Oort, and by Christiansen and Hindman in Australia. After 1952 the first maps of the neutral hydrogen in the Galaxy were made, and revealed for the first time the spiral structure of the Milky Way.

== Uses ==
=== In radio astronomy ===
The 21 cm spectral line appears within the radio spectrum (in the L band of the UHF band of the microwave window). Electromagnetic energy in this range easily passes through the Earth's atmosphere and can be observed from the Earth with little interference. The hydrogen line readily penetrates clouds of interstellar cosmic dust that are opaque to visible light. Assuming that the hydrogen atoms are uniformly distributed throughout the galaxy, each line of sight through the galaxy will reveal a hydrogen line. The only difference between each of these lines is the Doppler shift that each of these lines has. Hence, by assuming circular motion, one can calculate the relative speed of each arm of our galaxy. The rotation curve of our galaxy has been calculated using the 21 cm hydrogen line. It is then possible to use the plot of the rotation curve and the velocity to determine the distance to a certain point within the galaxy. However, a limitation of this method is that departures from circular motion are observed at various scales.

Hydrogen line observations have been used indirectly to calculate the mass of galaxies, to put limits on any changes over time of the fine-structure constant, and to study the dynamics of individual galaxies. The magnetic field strength of interstellar space can be measured by observing the Zeeman effect on the 21-cm line; a task that was first accomplished by G. L. Verschuur in 1968. In theory, it may be possible to search for antihydrogen atoms by measuring the polarization of the 21-cm line in an external magnetic field.

Deuterium has a similar hyperfine spectral line at 91.6 cm (327 MHz), and the relative strength of the 21 cm line to the 91.6 cm line can be used to measure the deuterium-to-hydrogen (D/H) ratio. One group in 2007 reported D/H ratio in the galactic anticenter to be 21 ± 7 parts per million.

=== In cosmology ===
The line is of great interest in Big Bang cosmology because it is the only known way to probe the cosmological "dark ages" from recombination (when stable hydrogen atoms first formed) to the reionization epoch. After including the redshift range for this period, this line will be observed at frequencies from 200 MHz to about 15 MHz on Earth. It potentially has two applications. First, by mapping the intensity of redshifted 21 centimeter radiation it can, in principle, provide a very precise picture of the matter power spectrum in the period after recombination. Second, it can provide a picture of how the universe was re‑ionized, as neutral hydrogen which has been ionized by radiation from stars or quasars will appear as holes in the 21 cm background.

However, 21 cm observations are very difficult to make. Ground-based experiments to observe the faint signal are plagued by interference from television transmitters and the ionosphere, so they must be made from very secluded sites with care taken to eliminate interference. Space based experiments, including on the far side of the Moon (where they would be sheltered from interference from terrestrial radio signals), have been proposed to compensate for this. Little is known about other foreground effects, such as synchrotron emission and free–free emission on the galaxy. Despite these problems, 21 cm observations, along with space-based gravitational wave observations, are generally viewed as the next great frontier in observational cosmology, after the cosmic microwave background polarization.

=== Relevance to the search for non-human intelligent life ===
The hyperfine transition of hydrogen, as depicted on the Pioneer and Voyager spacecraft

The Pioneer plaque, attached to the Pioneer 10 and Pioneer 11 spacecraft, portrays the hyperfine transition of neutral hydrogen and used the wavelength as a standard scale of measurement. For example, the height of the woman in the image is displayed as eight times 21 cm, or 168 cm. Similarly the frequency of the hydrogen spin-flip transition was used for a unit of time in a map to Earth included on the Pioneer plaques and also the Voyager 1 and Voyager 2 probes. On this map, the position of the Sun is portrayed relative to 14 pulsars whose rotation period circa 1977 is given as a multiple of the frequency of the hydrogen spin-flip transition. It is theorized by the plaque's creators that an advanced civilization would then be able to use the locations of these pulsars to locate the Solar System at the time the spacecraft were launched.

The 21 cm hydrogen line is considered a favorable frequency by the SETI program in their search for signals from potential extraterrestrial civilizations. In 1959, Italian physicist Giuseppe Cocconi and American physicist Philip Morrison published "Searching for interstellar communications", a paper proposing the 21 cm hydrogen line and the potential of microwaves in the search for interstellar communications. According to George Basalla, the paper by Cocconi and Morrison "provided a reasonable theoretical basis" for the then-nascent SETI program. Similarly, Pyotr Makovetsky proposed SETI use a frequency which is equal to either

π × 1420.40575177 MHz ≈ 4.46233627 GHz

or

2π × 1420.40575177 MHz ≈ 8.92467255 GHz

Since π is an irrational number, such a frequency could not possibly be produced in a natural way as a harmonic, and would clearly signify its artificial origin. Such a signal would not be overwhelmed by the H I line itself, or by any of its harmonics.

== See also ==
- Balmer series
- Chronology of the universe
- Dark Ages Radio Explorer
- Hydrogen spectral series
- Hydrogen-alpha, the visible-red spectral line with wavelength of 656.28 nanometers
- Rydberg formula
- Big Bang
- Murchison Widefield Array
