= Biohybrid microswimmer =

A biohybrid microswimmer also known as biohybrid nanorobot, can be defined as a microswimmer that consist of both biological and artificial constituents, for instance, one or several living microorganisms attached to one or various synthetic parts.

In recent years nanoscopic and mesoscopic objects have been designed to collectively move through direct inspiration from nature or by harnessing its existing tools. Small mesoscopic to nanoscopic systems typically operate at low Reynolds numbers (Re ≪ 1), and understanding their motion becomes challenging. For locomotion to occur, the symmetry of the system must be broken.

In addition, collective motion requires a coupling mechanism between the entities that make up the collective. To develop mesoscopic to nanoscopic entities capable of swarming behaviour, it has been hypothesised that the entities are characterised by broken symmetry with a well-defined morphology, and are powered with some material capable of harvesting energy. If the harvested energy results in a field surrounding the object, then this field can couple with the field of a neighbouring object and bring some coordination to the collective behaviour. Such robotic swarms have been categorised by an online expert panel as among the 10 great unresolved group challenges in the area of robotics. Although investigation of their underlying mechanism of action is still in its infancy, various systems have been developed that are capable of undergoing controlled and uncontrolled swarming motion by harvesting energy (e.g., light, thermal, etc.).

Over the past decade, biohybrid microrobots, in which living mobile microorganisms are physically integrated with untethered artificial structures, have gained growing interest to enable the active locomotion and cargo delivery to a target destination. In addition to the motility, the intrinsic capabilities of sensing and eliciting an appropriate response to artificial and environmental changes make cell-based biohybrid microrobots appealing for transportation of cargo to the inaccessible cavities of the human body for local active delivery of diagnostic and therapeutic agents.

== Background ==
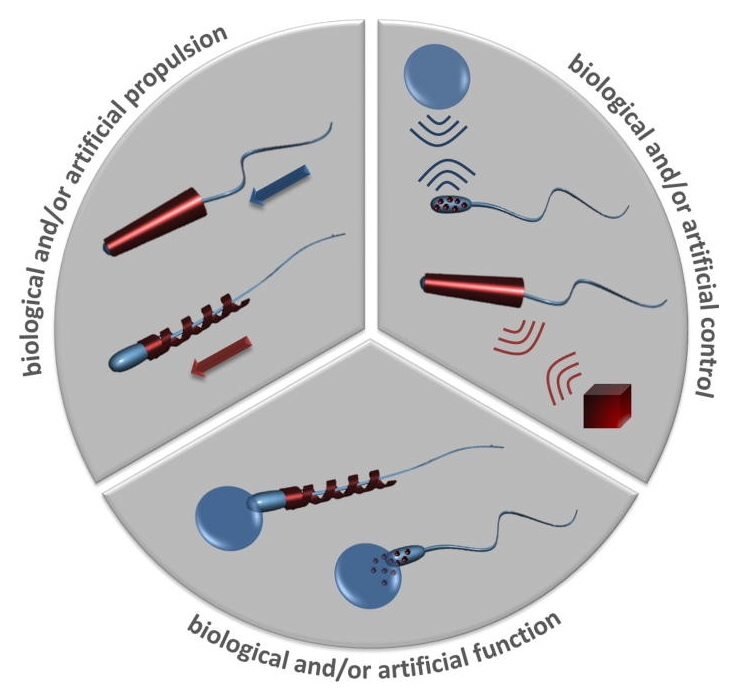
Basic features of an in vivo microrobot In a biohybrid approach, all three of these basic features can be realised either biologically by a microorganism, or artificially by synthetic attachments. Blue indicates biological entities (flagellated or target cells), red indicates artificial structures (attached tubes, helices, particles, or external devices). Arrows in the upper left panel indicate the motile actor, wave lines in the upper right panel indicate signal pathways. The lower panel shows how functionalities can be carried out based on cell-cell interactions or by synthetic cargo (red particles).

Biohybrid microswimmers can be defined as microswimmers that consist of both biological and artificial constituents, for instance, one or several living microorganisms attached to one or various synthetic parts. The pioneers of this field, ahead of their time, were Montemagno and Bachand with a 1999 work regarding specific attachment strategies of biological molecules to nanofabricated substrates enabling the preparation of hybrid inorganic/organic nanoelectromechanical systems, so called NEMS. They described the production of large amounts of F1-ATPase from the thermophilic bacteria Bacillus PS3 for the preparation of F1-ATPase biomolecular motors immobilized on a nanoarray pattern of gold, copper or nickel produced by electron beam lithography. These proteins were attached to one micron microspheres tagged with a synthetic peptide. Consequently, they accomplished the preparation of a platform with chemically active sites and the development of biohybrid devices capable of converting energy of biomolecular motors into useful work.

One of the most fundamental questions in science is what defines life. Collective motion is one of the hallmarks of life. This is commonly observed in nature at various dimensional levels as energized entities gather, in a concerted effort, into motile aggregated patterns. These motile aggregated events can be noticed, among many others, as dynamic swarms; e.g., unicellular organisms such as bacteria, locust swarms, or the flocking behaviour of birds.

Ever since Newton established his equations of motion, the mystery of motion on the microscale has emerged frequently in scientific history, as famously demonstrated by a couple of articles that should be discussed briefly. First, an essential concept, popularized by Osborne Reynolds, is that the relative importance of inertia and viscosity for the motion of a fluid depends on certain details of the system under consideration. The Reynolds number Re, named in his honor, quantifies this comparison as a dimensionless ratio of characteristic inertial and viscous forces:

$$\mathrm{Re} = \frac{\rho u l}{\mu}$$

Here, ρ represents the density of the fluid; u is a characteristic velocity of the system (for instance, the velocity of a swimming particle); l is a characteristic length scale (e.g., the swimmer size); and μ is the viscosity of the fluid. Taking the suspending fluid to be water, and using experimentally observed values for u, one can determine that inertia is important for macroscopic swimmers like fish (Re = 100), while viscosity dominates the motion of microscale swimmers like bacteria (Re = 10^{−4}).

The overwhelming importance of viscosity for swimming at the micrometer scale has profound implications for swimming strategy. This has been discussed memorably by E. M. Purcell, who invited the reader into the world of microorganisms and theoretically studied the conditions of their motion. In the first place, propulsion strategies of large scale swimmers often involve imparting momentum to the surrounding fluid in periodic discrete events, such as vortex shedding, and coasting between these events through inertia. This cannot be effective for microscale swimmers like bacteria: due to the large viscous damping, the inertial coasting time of a micron-sized object is on the order of 1 μs. The coasting distance of a microorganism moving at a typical speed is about 0.1 angstroms (Å). Purcell concluded that only forces that are exerted in the present moment on a microscale body contribute to its propulsion, so a constant energy conversion method is essential.

Microorganisms have optimized their metabolism for continuous energy production, while purely artificial microswimmers (microrobots) must obtain energy from the environment, since their on-board-storage-capacity is very limited. As a further consequence of the continuous dissipation of energy, biological and artificial microswimmers do not obey the laws of equilibrium statistical physics, and need to be described by non-equilibrium dynamics. Mathematically, Purcell explored the implications of low Reynolds number by taking the Navier-Stokes equation and eliminating the inertial terms:

$$\begin{align} \mu \nabla^2 \mathbf{u} -\boldsymbol{\nabla}p &= \boldsymbol{0} \\ \end{align}$$

where $\mathbf{u}$ is the velocity of the fluid and $\boldsymbol{\nabla} p$ is the gradient of the pressure. As Purcell noted, the resulting equation — the Stokes equation — contains no explicit time dependence. This has some important consequences for how a suspended body (e.g., a bacterium) can swim through periodic mechanical motions or deformations (e.g., of a flagellum). First, the rate of motion is practically irrelevant for the motion of the microswimmer and of the surrounding fluid: changing the rate of motion will change the scale of the velocities of the fluid and of the microswimmer, but it will not change the pattern of fluid flow. Secondly, reversing the direction of mechanical motion will simply reverse all velocities in the system. These properties of the Stokes equation severely restrict the range of feasible swimming strategies.

Recent publications of biohybrid microswimmers include the use of sperm cells, contractive muscle cells, and bacteria as biological components, as they can efficiently convert chemical energy into movement, and additionally are capable of performing complicated motion depending on environmental conditions. In this sense, biohybrid microswimmer systems can be described as the combination of different functional components: cargo and carrier. The cargo is an element of interest to be moved (and possibly released) in a customized way. The carrier is the component responsible for the movement of the biohybrid, transporting the desired cargo, which is linked to its surface. The great majority of these systems rely on biological motile propulsion for the transportation of synthetic cargo for targeted drug delivery/ There are also examples of the opposite case: artificial microswimmers with biological cargo systems.

Over the past decade, biohybrid microrobots, in which living mobile microorganisms are physically integrated with untethered artificial structures, have gained growing interest to enable the active locomotion and cargo delivery to a target destination. In addition to the motility, the intrinsic capabilities of sensing and eliciting an appropriate response to artificial and environmental changes make cell-based biohybrid microrobots appealing for transportation of cargo to the inaccessible cavities of the human body for local active delivery of diagnostic and therapeutic agents. Active locomotion, targeting and steering of concentrated therapeutic and diagnostic agents embedded in mobile microrobots to the site of action can overcome the existing challenges of conventional therapies. To this end, bacteria have been commonly used with attached beads and ghost cell bodies.

== Bacterial biohybrids ==
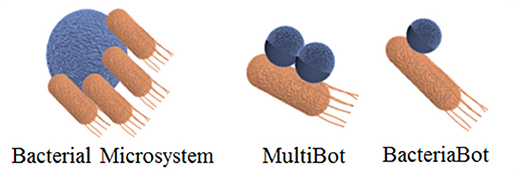
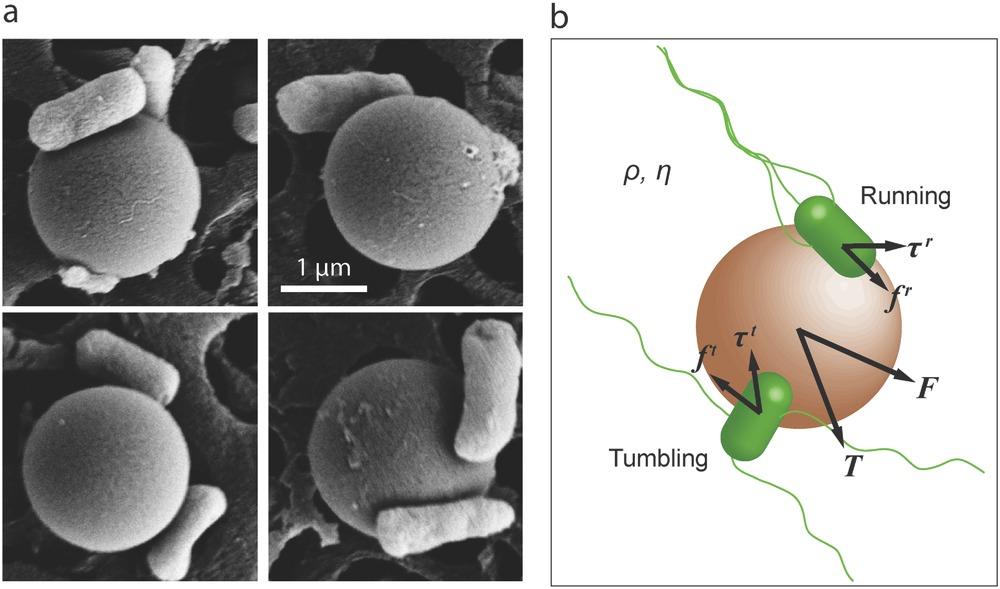
Bacteria-driven biohybrid microswimmers with a spherical body
(a) SEM images showing 2 μm diameter polystyrene microbeads, each attached by a few E. coli bacteria.
(b) An illustration of the forces and torques exerted on the spherical microbead by its attached bacteria, where the force and the motor reaction torque of each bacterium are state dependent.

Artificial micro and nanoswimmers are small scale devices that convert energy into movement. Since the first demonstration of their performance in 2002, the field has developed rapidly in terms of new preparation methodologies, propulsion strategies, motion control, and envisioned functionality. The field holds promise for applications such as drug delivery, environmental remediation and sensing. The initial focus of the field was largely on artificial systems, but an increasing number of "biohybrids" are appearing in the literature. Combining artificial and biological components is a promising strategy to obtain new, well-controlled microswimmer functionalities, since essential functions of living organisms are intrinsically related to the capability to move. Living beings of all scales move in response to environmental stimuli (e.g., temperature or pH), to look for food sources, to reproduce, or to escape from predators. One of the more well-known living microsystems is swimming bacteria, but directed motion occurs even at the molecular scale, where enzymes and proteins undergo conformational changes in order to carry out biological tasks.

Swimming bacterial cells have been used in the development of hybrid microswimmers. Cargo attachment to the bacterial cells might influence their swimming behavior. Bacterial cells in the swarming state have also been used in the development of hybrid microswimmers. Swarming Serratia marcescens cells were transferred to PDMS-coated coverslips, resulting in a structure referred to as a "bacterial carpet" by the authors. Differently shaped flat fragments of this bacterial carpets, termed "auto-mobile chips", moved above the surface of the microscope slide in two dimensions. Many other works have used Serratia marcescens swarming cells, as well as E. coli swarming cells for the development of hybrid microswimmers. Magnetotactic bacteria have been the focus of different studies due to their versatile uses in biohybrid motion systems.

== Protist biohybrids ==
=== Algal ===
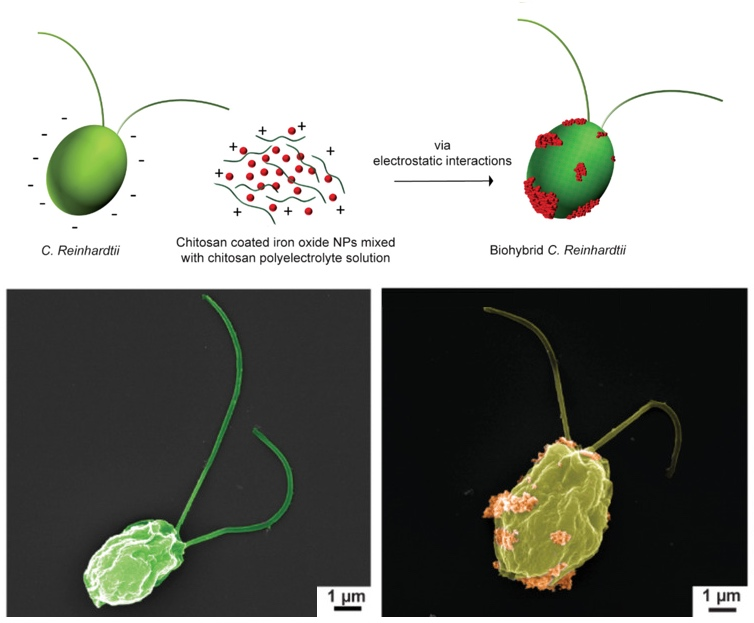
Biohybrid Chlamydomonas reinhardtii microswimmers Top: Schematics of production steps for biohybrid C. reinhardtii. Bottom: SEM images of bare microalgae (left) and biohybrid microalgae (right) coated with chitosan-coated iron oxide nanoparticles (CSIONPs). Images were pseudocolored. A darker green color on the right SEM image represents chitosan coating on microalgae cell wall. Orange-colored particles represents CSIONPs.

Chlamydomonas reinhardtii is a unicellular green microalga. The wild-type C. reinhardtii has a spherical shape that averages about 10 μm in diameter. This microorganism can perceive the visible light and be steered by it (i.e., phototaxis) with high swimming speeds in the range of 100–200 μm s^{−1}. It has natural autofluorescence that permits label-free fluorescent imaging. C. reinhardtii has been actively explored as the live component of biohybrid microrobots for the active delivery of therapeutics. They are biocompatible with healthy mammalian cells, leave no known toxins, mobile in the physiologically relevant media, and allow for surface modification to carry cargo on the cell wall. Alternative attachment strategies for C. reinhardtii have been proposed for the assembly through modifying the interacting surfaces by electrostatic interactions and covalent bonding.

=== Robocoliths ===
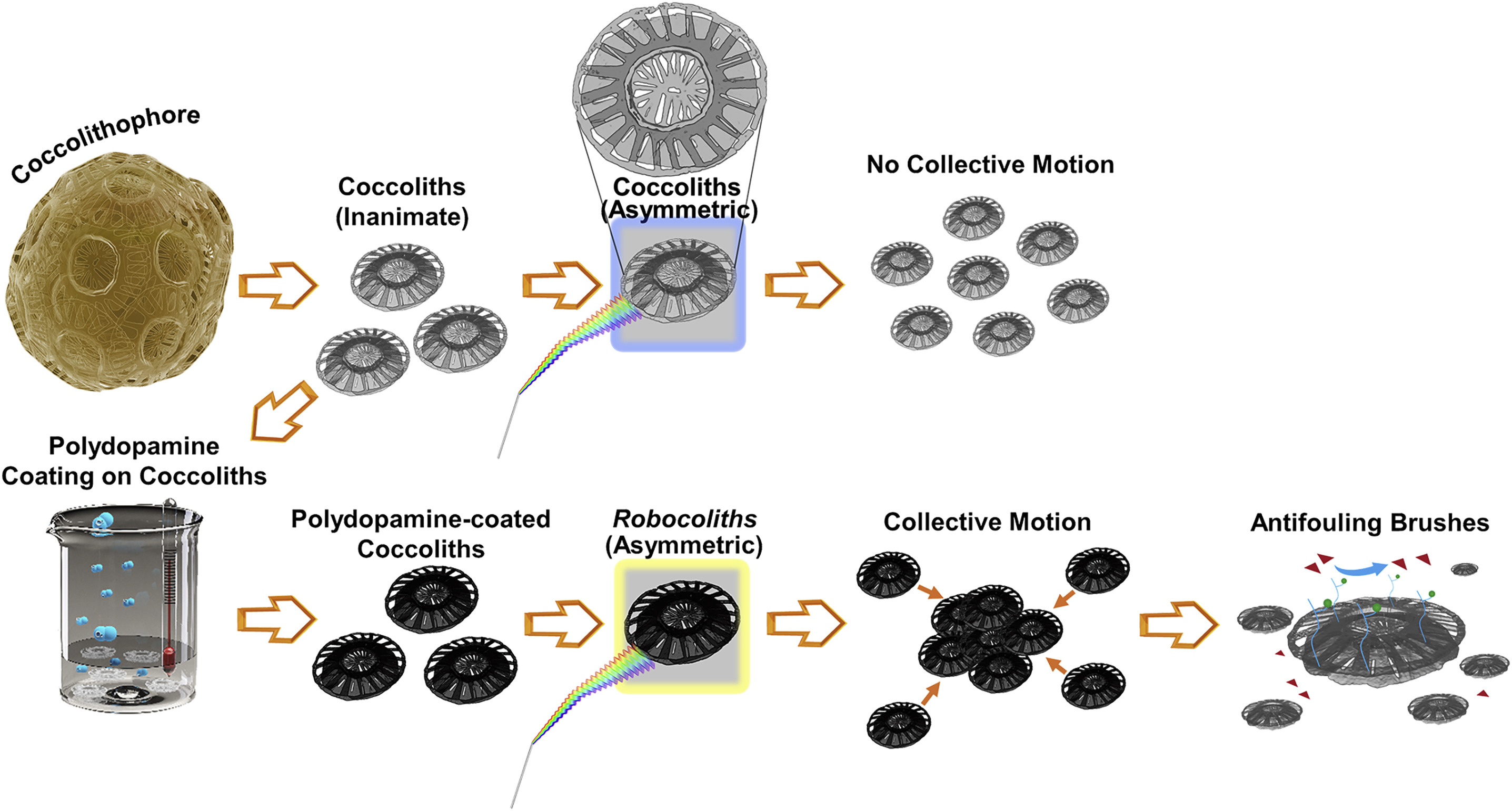
Robocolith hybrids combining polydopamine and coccoliths EHUX coccolithophores are cultivated for isolation of coccoliths. When coccoliths (asymmetric morphology) are exposed to light, no collective motion is observed. Coccoliths are then mixed gently with dopamine solutions. Thus, polydopamine-coated coccoliths hybrids are obtained as a basis for design of Robocoliths. Light excitation and the asymmetry of Robocoliths generates a thermal flux of heat because of polydopamine's photothermal properties. Coupling of convection from neighboring Robocoliths transforms their movement into an aggregated collective motion. Robocolith functionalization is also proposed to prevent and control nonspecific attachment of biomacromolecules and possible diminution of the aggregation.

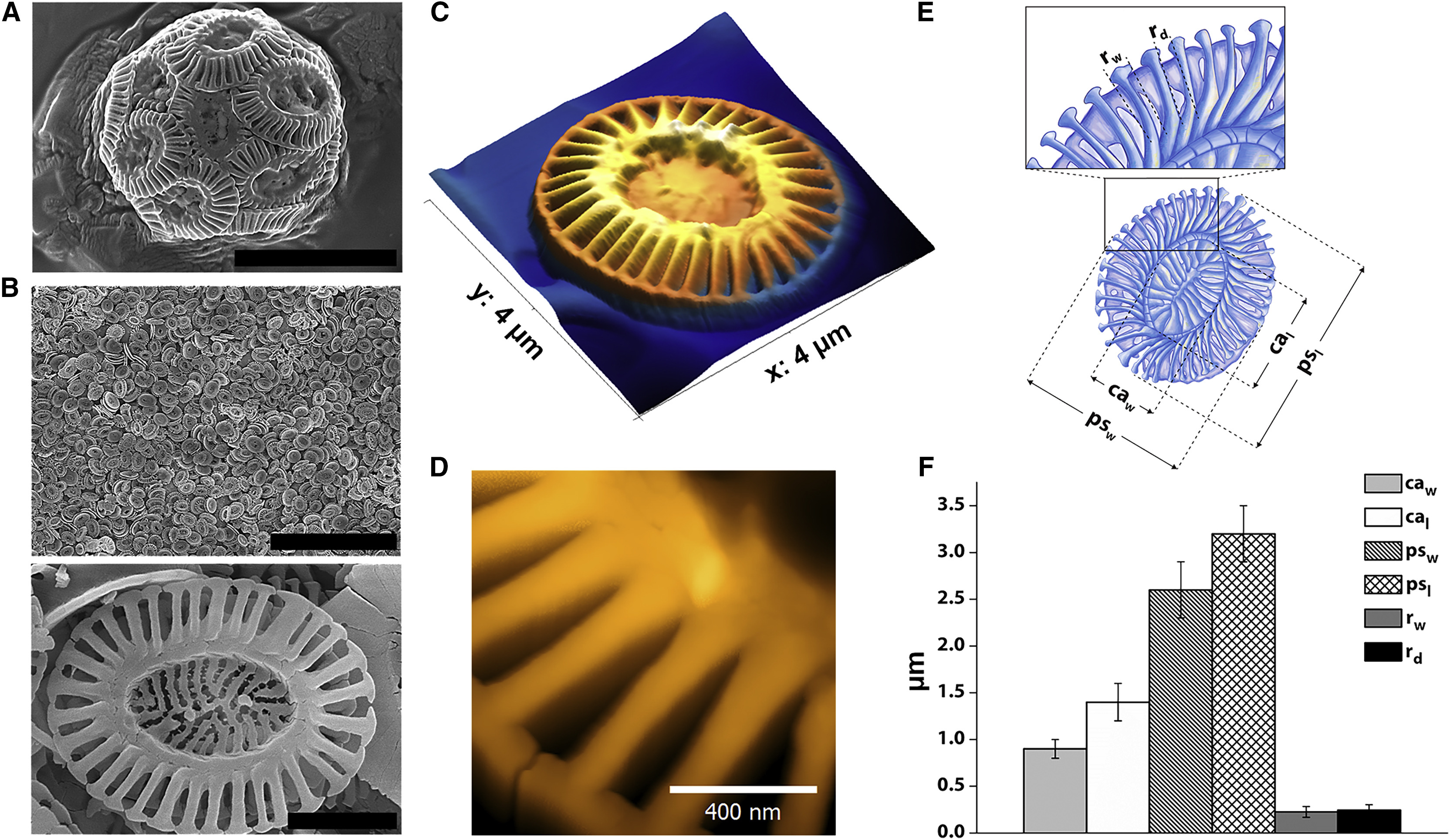
Asymmetric architecture of coccolith morphology (A) EHUX coccolithophores were cultivated successfully and visualized by SEM (scale bar, 4 μm). (B) Following this, we broke and removed the cellular material from EHUX coccolithophores to isolate multiple (top; scale bar, 20 μm) and individual (bottom; scale bar, 1 μm) coccoliths, as visualized by SEM. (C) AFM image of an individual coccolith. Micrograph size, 4 × 4 μm. (D) AFM magnification the micrograph of an individual coccolith. Scale bar, 400 nm. (E) Illustration of a coccolith, depicting its specific morphological parameters. (F) Typical plotted values of the specific morphological parameters. Data are represented as mean ± SD (n = 55), where n is the number of coccoliths visualized by TEM.

Collective motion is one of the hallmarks of life. In contrast to what is accomplished individually, multiple entities enable local interactions between each participant to occur in proximity. If we consider each participant in the collective behaviour as a (bio)physical transducer, then the energy will be converted from one type into another. The proxemics will then favour enhanced communication between neighbouring individuals via transduction of energy, leading to dynamic and complex synergetic behaviours of the composite powered structure.

In recent years nanoscopic and mesoscopic objects have been designed to collectively move through direct inspiration from nature or by harnessing its existing tools. Such robotic swarms were categorised by an online expert panel as among the 10 great unresolved group challenges in the area of robotics. Although investigation of their underlying mechanism of action is still in its infancy, various systems have been developed that are capable of undergoing controlled and uncontrolled swarming motion by harvesting energy (e.g., light, thermal, etc.). Importantly, this energy should be transformed into a net force for the system to move.

Small mesoscopic to nanoscopic systems typically operate at low Reynolds numbers (Re ≪ 1), and understanding their motion becomes challenging. For locomotion to occur, the symmetry of the system must be broken.14 In addition, collective motion requires a coupling mechanism between the entities that make up the collective.

To develop mesoscopic to nanoscopic entities capable of swarming behaviour, it has been hypothesised that the entities are characterised by broken symmetry with a well-defined morphology, and are powered with some material capable of harvesting energy. If the harvested energy results in a field surrounding the object, then this field can couple with the field of a neighbouring object and bring some coordination to the collective behaviour.

Emiliania huxleyi (EHUX) coccolithophore-derived asymmetric coccoliths stand out as candidates for the choice of a nano/mesoscopic object with broken symmetry and well-defined morphology. Besides the thermodynamical stability because of their calcite composition, the critical advantage of EHUX coccoliths is their distinctive and sophisticated asymmetric morphology. EHUX coccoliths are characterised by several hammer-headed ribs placed to form a proximal and distal disc connected by a central ring. These discs have different sizes but also allow the coccolith to have a curvature, partly resembling a wagon wheel. EHUX coccoliths can be isolated from EHUX coccolithophores, a unique group of unicellular marine algae that are the primary producers of biogenic calcite in the ocean. Coccolithophores can intracellularly produce intricate three-dimensional mineral structures, such as calcium carbonate scales (i.e., coccoliths), in a process that is driven continuously by a specialized vesicle.

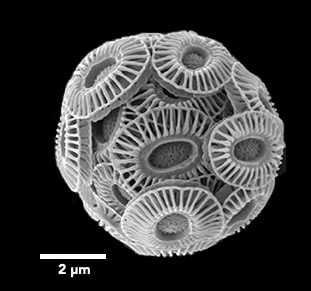
Emiliania huxleyi protected with asymmetric coccoliths

After the process is finished, the formed coccoliths are secreted to the cell surface, where they form the exoskeleton (i.e., coccosphere). The broad diversity of coccolith architecture results in further possibilities for specific applications in nanotechnology or biomedicine. Inanimate coccoliths from EHUX live coccolithophores, in particular, can be isolated easily in the laboratory with a low culture cost and fast reproductive rate and have a reasonably moderate surface area (~20 m^{2}/g) exhibiting a mesoporous structure (pore size in the range of 4 nm).

Presumably, if harvesting of energy is done on both sides of the EHUX coccolith, then it will allow generation of a net force, which means movement in a directional manner. Coccoliths have immense potential for a multitude of applications, but to enable harvesting of energy, their surface properties must be finely tuned. Inspired by the composition of adhesive proteins in mussels, dopamine self-polymerization into polydopamine is currently the most versatile functionalization strategy for virtually all types of materials. Because of its surface chemistry and wide range of light absorption properties, polydopamine is an ideal choice for aided energy harvesting function on inert substrates. In this work, we aim to exploit the benefits of polydopamine coating to provide advanced energy harvesting functionalities to the otherwise inert and inanimate coccoliths. Polydopamine (PDA has already been shown to induce movement of polystyrene beads because of thermal diffusion effects between the object and the surrounding aqueous solution of up to 2 °C under near-infrared (NIR) light excitation. However, no collective behavior has been reported. Here, we prove, for the first time, that polydopamine can act as an active component to induce, under visible light (300–600 nm), collective behavior of a structurally complex, natural, and challenging-to-control architecture such as coccoliths. As a result, the organic-inorganic hybrid combination (coccolith-polydopamine) would enable design of Robocoliths.

Dopamine polymerization proceeds in a solution, where it forms small colloidal aggregates that adsorb on the surface of the coccoliths, forming a confluent film. This film is characterized by high roughness, which translates into a high specific surface area and enhanced harvesting of energy. Because of the conjugated nature of the polymer backbone, polydopamine can absorb light over a broad electromagnetic spectrum, including the visible region.

As a result, the surface of coccoliths is endowed with a photothermal effect, locally heating and creating convection induced by the presence of PDA. This local convection is coupled with another nearby local convection, which allows coupling between individual Robocoliths, enabling their collective motion (Figure 1).

Therefore, when the light encounters the anisometric Robocoliths, they heat locally because of the photothermal conversion induced by the presence of PDA on their surface. The intense local heating produces convection that is different on either side of the Robocolith, causing its observed movement. Such convection can couple with the convection of a neighboring Robocolith, resulting in a "swarming" motion. In addition, the surface of Robocoliths is engineered to accommodate antifouling polymer brushes and potentially prevent their aggregation. Although a primary light-activated convective approach is taken as a first step to understand the motion of Robocoliths, a multitude of mechanistic approaches are currently being developed to pave the way for the next generation of multifunctional Robocoliths as swarming bio-micromachines.

== Biomedical applications ==
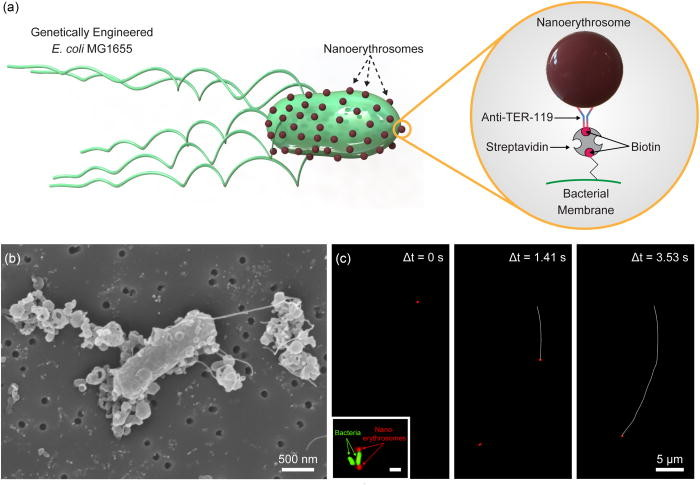
Biohybrid bacterial microswimmers

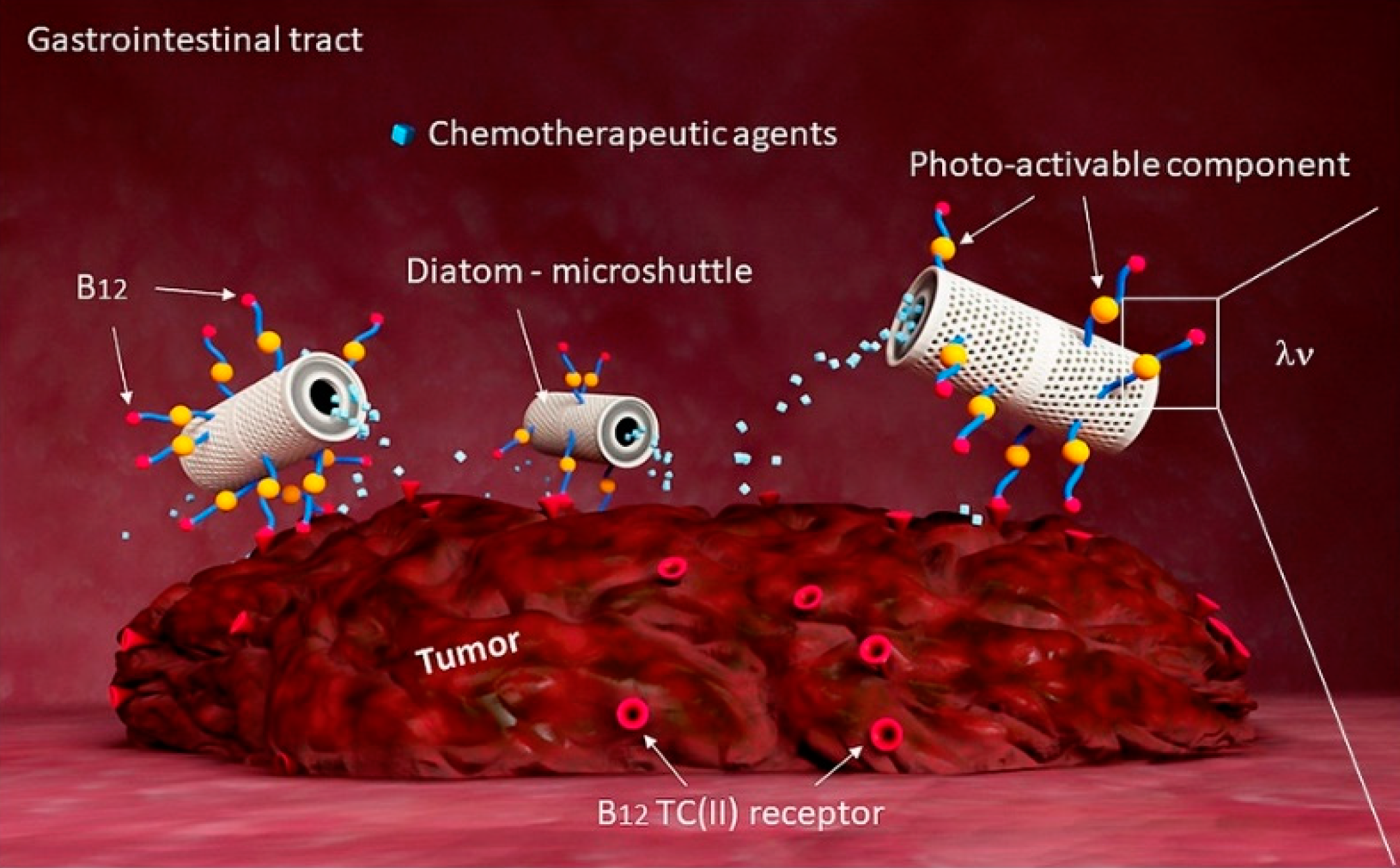
Biohybrid diatomite microswimmer drug delivery system Diatom frustule surface functionalised with photoactivable molecules (orange spheres) linked to vitamin B-12 (red sphere) acting as a tumor-targeting tag. The system can be loaded with chemotherapeutic drugs (light blue spheres), which can be selectively delivered to colorectal cancer cells. In addition, diatomite microparticles can be photoactivated to generate carbon monoxide or free radicals inducing tumor cell apoptosis.

Biohybrid microswimmers, mainly composed of integrated biological actuators and synthetic cargo carriers, have recently shown promise toward minimally invasive theranostic applications. Various microorganisms, including bacteria, microalgae, and spermatozoids, have been utilised to fabricate different biohybrid microswimmers with advanced medical functionalities, such as autonomous control with environmental stimuli for targeting, navigation through narrow gaps, and accumulation to necrotic regions of tumor environments. Steerability of the synthetic cargo carriers with long-range applied external fields, such as acoustic or magnetic fields, and intrinsic taxis behaviours of the biological actuators toward various environmental stimuli, such as chemoattractants, pH, and oxygen, make biohybrid microswimmers a promising candidate for a broad range of medical active cargo delivery applications.

Bacteria have a high swimming speed and efficiency in the low Reynolds (Re) number flow regime, are capable of sensing and responding to external environmental signals, and could be externally detected via fluorescence or ultrasound imaging techniques. Due to their inherent sensing capabilities, various bacteria species have been investigated as potential anti-tumor agents and have been the subject of preclinical and clinical trials. The presence of different bacteria species in the human body, such as on the skin and the gut microenvironment, has promoted their use as potential theranostic agents or carriers in several medical applications.

On the other hand, specialised eukaryotic cells, such as red blood cells (RBCs), are one of the nature's most efficient passive carriers with high payload efficiency, deformability, degradability, and biocompatibility, and have also been used in various medical applications. RBCs and RBC-derived nanovesicle, such as nanoerythrosomes, have been successfully adopted as passive cargo carriers to enhance the circulation time of the applied substances in the body, and to deliver different bioactive substances for the treatment of various diseases observed in the liver, spleen and lymph nodes, and also cancer via administrating through intravenous, intraperitoneal, subcutaneous, and inhalational routes. For instance, decreased recognition of drug-loaded particles by immune cells was shown when attached to membranes of the RBCs prior to intravenous injection into mice. Additionally, the altered bioaccumulation profile of nanocarriers was shown when conjugated onto the RBCs, boosting the delivery of nanocarriers to the target organs. It was also reported that the half-life of Fasudil, a drug for pulmonary arterial hypertension, inside the body increased approximately sixfold to eightfold when it was loaded into nanoerythrosomes.

Superior cargo-carrying properties of the RBCs have also generated increased interest for their use in biohybrid microswimmer designs. Recently, active navigation and control of drug and superparamagnetic nanoparticle (SPION)-loaded RBCs were presented using sound waves and magnetic fields. RBCs were further utilized in the fabrication of soft biohybrid microswimmers powered by motile bacteria for active cargo delivery applications. RBCs, loaded with drug molecules and SPIONs, were propelled by bacteria and steered via magnetic fields, which were also capable of traveling through gaps smaller than their size due to the inherent high deformability of the RBCs.
