= Scallop theorem =

Physics theorem about a swimmer's displacement

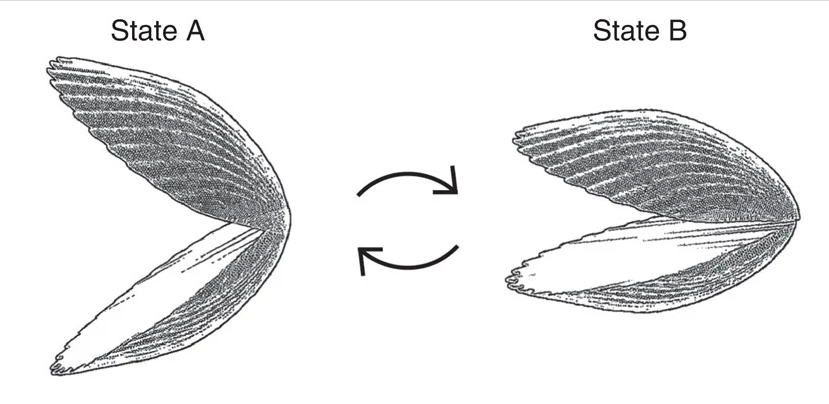
A scallop swims by slowly opening its two halves, then quickly closing them. This is a successful swimming method because the inertial force of the surrounding water dominates over the viscous force. In a low Reynolds number environment, a scallop would only oscillate in place.

In physics, the scallop theorem states that a swimmer that performs a reciprocal motion cannot achieve net displacement in a low-Reynolds number Newtonian fluid environment, i.e. a fluid that is highly viscous. Such a swimmer deforms its body into a particular shape through a sequence of motions and then reverts to the original shape by going through the sequence in reverse. At low Reynolds number, time or inertia does not come into play, and the swimming motion is purely determined by the sequence of shapes that the swimmer assumes.

Edward Mills Purcell stated this theorem in his 1977 paper Life at Low Reynolds Number explaining physical principles of aquatic locomotion. The theorem is named for the motion of a scallop which opens and closes a simple hinge during one period. Such motion is not sufficient to create migration at low Reynolds numbers. The scallop is an example of a body with one degree of freedom to use for motion. Bodies with a single degree of freedom deform in a reciprocal manner and subsequently, bodies with one degree of freedom do not achieve locomotion in a highly viscous environment.

== Background ==
Animation of a Najafi-Golestanian 3-sphere microswimmer. It has one degree of freedom where the left arm extends and retracts. In low Reynolds number environments, this leads to no net displacement of the whole body as the arm completes a cycle of extension and retraction.

The scallop theorem is a consequence of the subsequent forces applied to the organism as it swims from the surrounding fluid. For an incompressible Newtonian fluid with density $\rho$ and dynamic viscosity $\eta$, the flow satisfies the Navier–Stokes equations:

$$\rho\left(\dfrac{\partial}{\partial\mathrm{t}}+\mathbf{u}\cdot\nabla\right)\mathbf{u}=-\nabla p+\eta\nabla^2\mathbf{u},\quad \nabla\cdot\mathbf{u}=0,$$

where $\mathbf{u}$ denotes the velocity of the fluid. However, at the low Reynolds number limit, the inertial terms of the Navier-Stokes equations on the left-hand side tend to zero. This is made more apparent by nondimensionalizing the Navier–Stokes equations. By defining a characteristic velocity and length, $u_0$ and $L$, we can cast our variables to dimensionless form:

$$\mathbf{\tilde{u}}=\dfrac{\mathbf{u}}{u_0};\quad\mathbf{\tilde{r}}=\dfrac{\mathbf{r}}{L};\quad\tilde{t}=\dfrac{t}{(L/u_0)};\quad\tilde{p}=\dfrac{p}{(\eta u_0/L)}.$$

where the dimensionless pressure is appropriately scaled for flow with significant viscous effects. Plugging these quantities into the Navier-Stokes equations gives us:

$$\dfrac{\rho u_{0}^{2}}{L}\left(\dfrac{\partial}{\partial\tilde{t}}+\mathbf{\tilde{u}}\cdot\tilde{\nabla}\right)\mathbf{\tilde{u}}=-\dfrac{\eta u_{0}}{L^{2}}\left( \tilde{\nabla} \tilde{p}+\tilde{\nabla}^2\mathbf{\tilde{u}} \right ),\quad \tilde{\nabla}\cdot\mathbf{\tilde{u}}=0.$$

And by rearranging terms, we arrive at a dimensionless form:

$$\text{Re}\left(\dfrac{\partial}{\partial\tilde{t}}+\mathbf{\tilde{u}}\cdot\tilde{\nabla}\right)\mathbf{\tilde{u}}=-\tilde{\nabla} \tilde{p}+\tilde{\nabla}^2\mathbf{\tilde{u}},\quad \tilde{\nabla}\cdot\mathbf{\tilde{u}}=0,$$

where $\text{Re} = \rho u_0L/\eta$ is the Reynolds number. In the low Reynolds number limit (as $\mathrm{Re}\rightarrow 0$), the LHS tends to zero and we arrive at a dimensionless form of Stokes equations. Redimensionalizing yields:

$$0=-\nabla p+\eta\nabla^2\mathbf{u},\quad \nabla\cdot\mathbf{u}=0.$$

== Statement ==
The consequences of having no inertial terms at low Reynolds number are:

- One consequence means that the swimmer experiences virtually no net force or torque.
- A second consequence tells us that the velocity is linearly proportional to the force (same can be said about angular velocity and torque).
- The Stokes equations become are linear and independent of time.

In particular, for a swimmer moving in the low Reynolds number regime, its motion satisfies:

- Independent of time: The same motion may be sped up or slowed down, and it would still satisfy the Stokes equations. More geometrically, this means that the motion of a swimmer in the low Reynolds number regime is purely determined by the shape of its trajectory in configuration space.
- Kinematic reversibility: The same motion may be reversed. Any instantaneous reversal of the forces acting on the body will not change the nature of the fluid flow around it, simply the direction of the flow. These forces are responsible for producing motion. When a body has only one degree of freedom, reversal of forces will cause the body to deform in a reciprocal fashion. For instance, a scallop opening its hinge will simply close it to try to achieve propulsion. Since the reversal of forces does not change the nature of the flow, the body will move in the reverse direction in the exact same manner, leading to no net displacement. This is how we arrive at the consequences of the scallop theorem.

== Proof by scaling ==
This is closer in spirit to the proof sketch given by Purcell. The key result is to show that a swimmer in a Stokes fluid does not depend on time. That is, a one cannot detect if a movie of a swimmer motion is slowed down, sped up, or reversed. The other results then are simple corollaries.

The stress tensor of the fluid is $\sigma_{i j}=-p \delta_{i j}+\mu (\partial_i u_j + \partial_j u_i)$.

Let $r$ be a nonzero real constant. Suppose we have a swimming motion, then we can do the following scaling:
$$p \mapsto rp; \quad u \mapsto ru;\quad \sigma \mapsto r\sigma$$
and obtain another solution to the Stokes equation. That is, if we scale hydrostatic pressure, flow-velocity, and stress tensor all by $r$, we still obtain a solution to the Stokes equation.

Since the motion is in the low Reynolds number regime, inertial forces are negligible, and the instantaneous total force and torque on the swimmer must both balance to zero. Since the instantaneous total force and torque on the swimmer is computed by integrating the stress tensor $\sigma$ over its surface, the instantaneous total force and torque increase by $r$ as well, which are still zero.

Thus, scaling both the swimmer's motion and the motion of the surrounding fluid scales by the same factor, we still obtain a motion that respects the Stokes equation.

== Proof by vector calculus ==
The proof of the scallop theorem can be represented in a mathematically elegant way. To do this, we must first understand the mathematical consequences of the linearity of Stokes equations. To summarize, the linearity of Stokes equations allows us to use the reciprocal theorem to relate the swimming velocity of the swimmer to the velocity field of the fluid around its surface (known as the swimming gait), which changes according to the periodic motion it exhibits. This relation allows us to conclude that locomotion is independent of swimming rate. Subsequently, this leads to the discovery that reversal of periodic motion is identical to the forward motion due to symmetry, allowing us to conclude that there can be no net displacement.

=== Rate-independence ===
The reciprocal theorem describes the relationship between two Stokes flows in the same geometry where inertial effects are insignificant compared to viscous effects. Consider a fluid filled region $V$ bounded by surface $S$ with a unit normal $\hat{\mathbf{n}}$. Suppose we have solutions to Stokes equations in the domain $V$ possessing the form of the velocity fields $\mathbf{u}$ and $\mathbf{u}'$. The velocity fields harbor corresponding stress fields $\boldsymbol{\sigma}$ and $\boldsymbol{\sigma}'$ respectively. Then the following equality holds:

$$\iint_S \mathbf{u}\cdot (\boldsymbol{\sigma}' \cdot \hat{\mathbf{n}})~\mathrm{d}S = \iint_S \mathbf{u}' \cdot (\boldsymbol{\sigma} \cdot \hat{\mathbf{n}})~\mathrm{d}S.$$

The reciprocal theorem allows us to obtain information about a certain flow by using information from another flow. This is preferable to solving Stokes equations, which is difficult due to not having a known boundary condition. This is particularly useful if one wants to understand flow from a complicated problem by studying the flow of a simpler problem in the same geometry.

One can use the reciprocal theorem to relate the swimming velocity, $\mathbf{U}$, of a swimmer subject to a force $\hat{\mathbf{F}}$ to its swimming gait $\mathbf{u}_S$:

$$\hat{\mathbf{F}}\cdot\mathbf{U} = -\iint_S \mathbf{u}_S\cdot (\boldsymbol{\hat{\sigma}} \cdot \mathbf{n})~\mathrm{d}S.$$

Now that we have established that the relationship between the instantaneous swimming velocity in the direction of the force acting on the body and its swimming gait follow the general form

$$\mathbf{U} = \iint \dot{\mathbf{r}}_S\cdot\mathbf{g}(\mathbf{r}_S)~\mathrm{d}S,$$

where $\mathbf{u}_S\equiv\dot{\mathbf{r}}_S=\mathrm{d}\mathbf{r}_S/\mathrm{d}t$ and $\mathbf{r}_S$ denote the positions of points on the surface of the swimmer, we can establish that locomotion is independent of rate. Consider a swimmer that deforms in a periodic fashion through a sequence of motions between the times $t_0$ and $t_1.$ The net displacement of the swimmer is

$$\Delta X=\int_{t_0}^{t_1}\mathbf{U}~\mathrm{d}t.$$

Now consider the swimmer deforming in the same manner but at a different rate. We describe this with the mapping

$$t' = f(t),\quad \mathbf{r}_S(t)=\mathbf{r'}_S(t'),\quad \dot{\mathbf{r}}_S(t)=\dfrac{\mathrm{d}\mathbf{r'}_S(t')}{\mathrm{d}t}=\dfrac{\mathrm{d}\mathbf{r'}_S(t')}{\mathrm{d}t'}\cdot\dfrac{\mathrm{d}t'}{\mathrm{d}t}=\dot{\mathbf{r}}_S'(t')\dot{f}(t).$$

Using this mapping, we see that

$$\Delta X'=\int_{t_0}^{t_1}\mathbf{U}'(t')~\mathrm{d}t'=\int_{t_0}^{t_1}\mathbf{U}'(f(t))\dot{f}~\mathrm{d}t= \int_{t_0}^{t_1}\iint \dot{\mathbf{r}}_S'\dot{f}\cdot\mathbf{g}(\mathbf{r'}_S)~\mathrm{d}S\mathrm{d}t=\int_{t_0}^{t_1}\iint \dot{\mathbf{r}}_S\cdot\mathbf{g}(\mathbf{r}_S)~\mathrm{d}S\mathrm{d}t$$
$$=\int_{t_0}^{t_1}\mathbf{U}(t)~\mathrm{d}t\rightarrow\Delta X'=\Delta X.$$

This result means that the net distance traveled by the swimmer does not depend on the rate at which it is being deformed, but only on the geometrical sequence of shape. This is the first key result.

=== Symmetry of forward and backward motion ===
If a swimmer is moving in a periodic fashion that is time invariant, we know that the average displacement during one period must be zero. To illustrate the proof, let us consider a swimmer deforming during one period that starts and ends at times $t_0$ and $t_1$. That means its shape at the start and end are the same, i.e. $\mathbf{r}_S(t_0)=\mathbf{r}_S(t_1).$ Next, we consider motion obtained by time-reversal symmetry of the first motion that occurs during the period starting and ending at times $t_2$ and $t_3.$ Using a similar mapping as in the previous section, we define $t_2 = f(t_1)$ and $t_3 = f(t_0)$ and define the shape in the reverse motion to be the same as the shape in the forward motion, $\mathbf{r}_S(t)=\mathbf{r}'_S(t').$ Now we find the relationship between the net displacements in these two cases:

$$\Delta X'=\int_{t_2}^{t_3}\mathbf{U}'(t')~\mathrm{d}t'=\int_{t_1}^{t_0}\mathbf{U}(t)~\mathrm{d}t=-\int_{t_0}^{t_1}\mathbf{U}(t)~\mathrm{d}t=-\Delta X.$$

This is the second key result. Combining with our first key result from the previous section, we see that $\Delta X'=\Delta X=-\Delta X \rightarrow \Delta X = 0.$ We see that a swimmer that reverses its motion by reversing its sequence of shape changes leads to the opposite distance traveled. In addition, since the swimmer exhibits reciprocal body deformation, the sequence of motion is the same between $t_2$ and $t_3$ and $t_0$ and $t_1.$ Thus, the distance traveled should be the same independently of the direction of time, meaning that reciprocal motion cannot be used for net motion in low Reynolds number environments.

== Exceptions ==
The scallop theorem holds if we assume that a swimmer undergoes reciprocal motion in an infinite quiescent Newtonian fluid in the absence of inertia and external body forces. However, there are instances where the assumptions for the scallop theorem are violated. In one case, successful swimmers in viscous environments must display non-reciprocal body kinematics. In another case, if a swimmer is in a non-Newtonian fluid, locomotion can be achieved as well.

=== Types of non-reciprocal motion ===
In his original paper, Purcell proposed a simple example of non-reciprocal body deformation, now commonly known as the Purcell swimmer. This simple swimmer possess two degrees of freedom for motion: a two-hinged body composed of three rigid links rotating out-of-phase with each other. However, any body with more than one degree of freedom of motion can achieve locomotion as well.

In general, microscopic organisms like bacteria have evolved different mechanisms to perform non-reciprocal motion:

- Use of a flagellum, which rotates, pushing the medium backwards — and the cell forwards — in much the same way that a ship's screw moves a ship. This is how some bacteria move; the flagellum is attached at one end to a complex rotating motor held rigidly in the bacterial cell surface.
- Use of a flexible arm: this could be done in many different ways. For example, mammalian sperm have a flagellum which, whip-like, wriggles at the end of the cell, pushing the cell forward. Cilia are quite similar structures to mammalian flagella; they can advance a cell like paramecium by a complex motion not dissimilar to breast stroke.

Geometrically, the rotating flagellum is a one-dimensional swimmer, and it works because its motion is going around a circle-shaped configuration space, and a circle is not a reciprocating motion. The flexible arm is a multi-dimensional swimmer, and it works because its motion is going around a circle in a square-shaped configuration space. Notice that the first kind of motion has nontrivial homotopy, but the second kind has trivial homotopy.

=== Non-Newtonian fluids ===
The assumption of a Newtonian fluid is essential since Stokes equations will not remain linear and time-independent in an environment that possesses complex mechanical and rheological properties. It is also common knowledge that many living microorganisms live in complex non-Newtonian fluids, which are common in biologically relevant environments. For instance, crawling cells often migrate in elastic polymeric fluids. Non-Newtonian fluids have several properties that can be manipulated to produce small scale locomotion.

First, one such exploitable property is normal stress differences. These differences will arise from the stretching of the fluid by the flow of the swimmer. Another exploitable property is stress relaxation. Such time evolution of such stresses contain a memory term, though the extent in which this can be utilized is largely unexplored. Last, non-Newtonian fluids possess viscosities that are dependent on the shear rate. In other words, a swimmer would experience a different Reynolds number environment by altering its rate of motion. Many biologically relevant fluids exhibit shear-thinning, meaning viscosity decreases with shear rate. In such an environment, the rate at which a swimmer exhibits reciprocal motion would be significant as it would no longer be time invariant. This is in stark contrast to what we established where the rate in which a swimmer moves is irrelevant for establishing locomotion. Thus, a reciprocal swimmer can be designed in a non-Newtonian fluid. Qiu et al. (2014) were able to design a micro scallop in a non-Newtonian fluid.

== See also ==
- Bacterial motility
- Microswimmer
- Protist locomotion
