= Robotic sperm =

Biohybrid microrobots

Robotic sperm (also called spermbots) are biohybrid microrobots consisting of sperm cells and artificial microstructures. Currently there are two types of spermbots. The first type, the tubular spermbot, consists of a single sperm cell that is captured inside a microtube. Single bull sperm cells enter these microtubes and become trapped inside. The tail of the sperm is the driving force for the microtube. The second type, the helical spermbot, is a small helix structure which captures and transports single immotile sperm cells. In this case, a rotating magnetic field drives the helix in a screw-like motion. Both kinds of spermbots can be guided by weak magnetic fields. These two spermbot designs are hybrid microdevices, they consist of a living cell combined with synthetic attachments. Other approaches exist to create purely synthetic microdevices inspired by the swimming of natural sperm cells, i.e. with a biomimetic design, for example so-called Magnetosperm which are made of a flexible polymeric structure coated with a magnetic layer and can be actuated by a magnetic field.

== Design ==
=== Tubular spermbots ===
Initially, the microtubes for the tubular spermbots were made using roll-up nanotechnology on photoresist. In this process, thin films of titanium and iron were deposited onto a sacrificial layer. When the sacrificial layer was removed, the thin films rolled into 50 μm long microtubes with a diameter of 5 - 8 μm. Later on, the microtubes were made from a temperature-responsive polymer to enable the controlled release of the sperm cells upon a small temperature change of a few degrees.

Tubular spermbots are assembled by adding a large amount of the microtubes to a diluted sperm sample under the microscope. The sperm cells randomly enter the microtubes and become trapped in their slightly conical cavity. In order to increase the coupling efficiency between sperm cells and microtubes, the microtubes have been functionalized with proteins or sperm chemoattractant. This has been done using thiol chemistry once the tubes are rolled-up or by transferring the molecules with an elastomer stamp onto the material before rolling the tubes.

=== Helical spermbots ===
Helical spermbots are assembled by driving a magnetic microhelix over an individual sperm cell, thereby confining its tail inside the helix lumen and pushing the head of the sperm forward. The sperm cell is loosely coupled to the helix and can be released by reversing the rotation of the helix, letting it withdraw from the head and free the confined tail in the process. Such microhelices were fabricated by direct laser lithography and coated with nickel or iron for magnetization.

== Navigation ==
Robotic sperm can be navigated by weak external magnetic fields of a few mT. These fields can be generated by permanent magnets or by a setup of electromagnets. The applied magnetic field can be a homogeneous, rotating, or gradient field. Tubular and helical spermbots can also be navigated in a closed-loop control scheme with an electromagnetic coil setup.

== Applications ==
Spermbots hold promise for potential application in single cell manipulation and assisted reproduction, but also for targeted drug delivery. A recent study shows that modified tubular spermbots can be used for delivery of cancer drugs. In this case, the sperm cell is loaded with doxorubicin. The artificial microstructure fabricated by two-photon nanolithography captures the drug-loaded sperm cell. The sperm cell is the actuation source for the magnetic microstructure and can propel it to cancer spheroids. At this location, the drug-loaded sperm is released by a spring mechanism and the sperm cell delivers the drug to the cancer cells.

== Perspectives ==
Robotic sperms as microswimmers have potential for diverse biomedical applications, specifically for new assisted fertilization techniques and for the targeted delivery of therapeutic cargo. These microswimmers are meant to operate in in vivo environments, a feature that may aid in certain future assisted reproduction technologies and nanomedicine. Different applications have been conceptualized from the concept, in part due to the novel designs that have arisen.
