= Microswimmer =

Microscopic object able to traverse fluid

A microswimmer is a microscopic object with the ability to move in a fluid environment. Natural microswimmers are found everywhere in the natural world as biological microorganisms, such as bacteria, archaea, protists, sperm, and microanimals. Since the turn of the millennium, there has been increasing interest in manufacturing synthetic and biohybrid microswimmers. Although only two decades have passed since their emergence, they have already shown promise for various biomedical and environmental applications.

Given the recent nature of the field, there is yet no consensus in the literature for the nomenclature of the microscopic objects this article refers to as "microswimmers". Among the many alternative names such objects are given in the literature, microswimmers, microscale swimmers, micro/nanorobots and micro/nanomotors are likely the most frequently encountered. Other common terms may be more descriptive, including information about the object shape, e.g., microtube or microhelix, its components, e.g., biohybrid, spermbot, bacteriabot, or micro-bio-robot, or behavior, e.g., microrocket, microbullet, microtool or microroller. Researchers have also named their specific microswimmers e.g., medibots, hairbots, iMushbots, IRONSperm, teabots, biobots, T-budbots, or MOFBOTS.

== Background ==
In 1828, the British biologist Robert Brown discovered the incessant jiggling motion of pollen in water and described his finding in his article "A Brief Account of Microscopical Observations…", leading to extended scientific discussion about the origin of this motion. This enigma was resolved only in 1905, when Albert Einstein published his celebrated essay Über die von der molekularkinetischen Theorie der Wärme geforderte Bewegung von in ruhenden Flüssigkeiten suspendierten Teilchen. Einstein not only deduced the diffusion of suspended particles in quiescent liquids, but also suggested these findings could be used to determine particle size — in a sense, he was the world's first microrheologist.

Ever since Newton established his equations of motion, the mystery of motion on the microscale has emerged frequently in scientific history, as famously demonstrated by a couple of articles that should be discussed briefly. First, an essential concept, popularized by Osborne Reynolds, is that the relative importance of inertia and viscosity for the motion of a fluid depends on certain details of the system under consideration. The Reynolds number Re, named in his honor, quantifies this comparison as a dimensionless ratio of characteristic inertial and viscous forces:

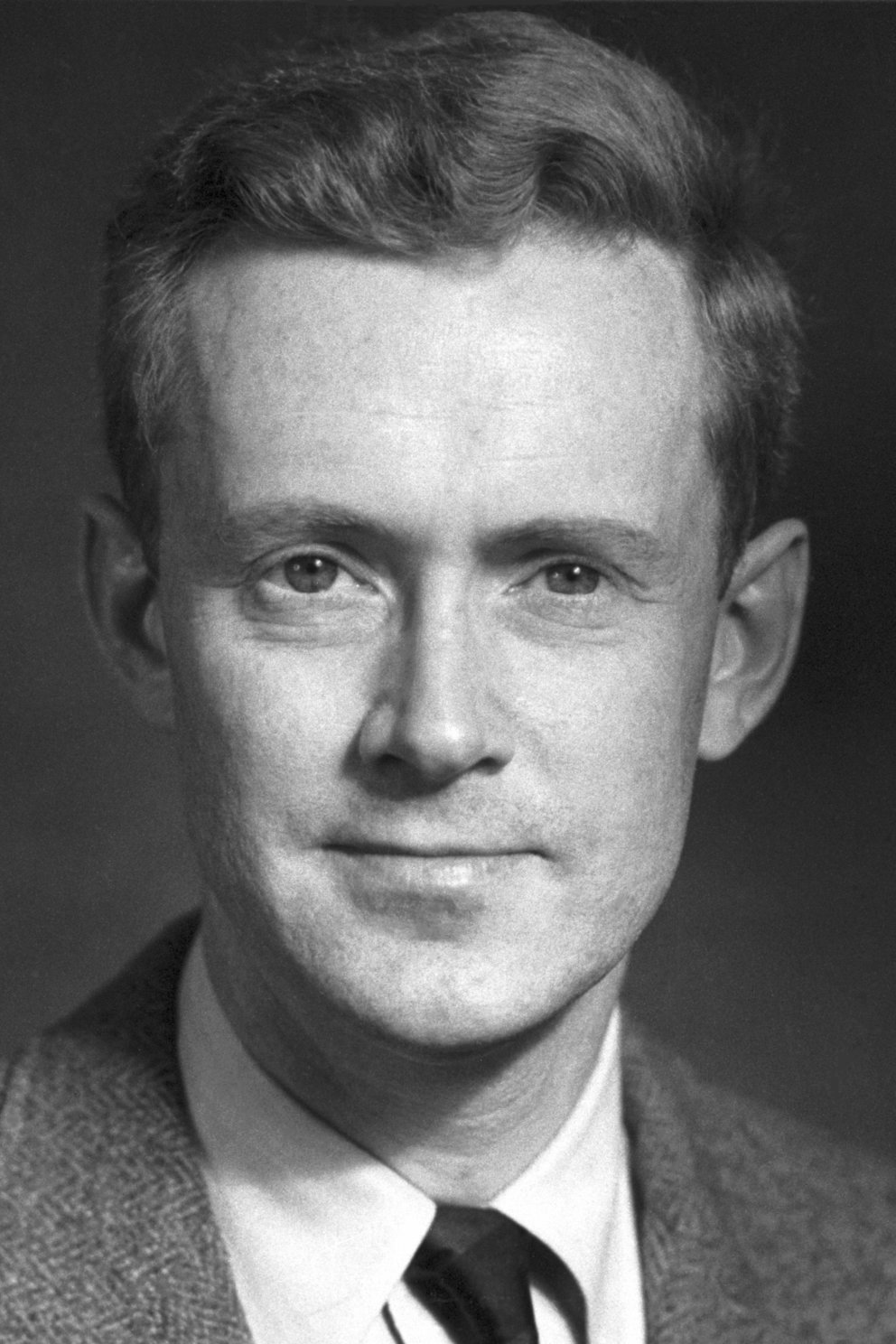
E. M. Purcell

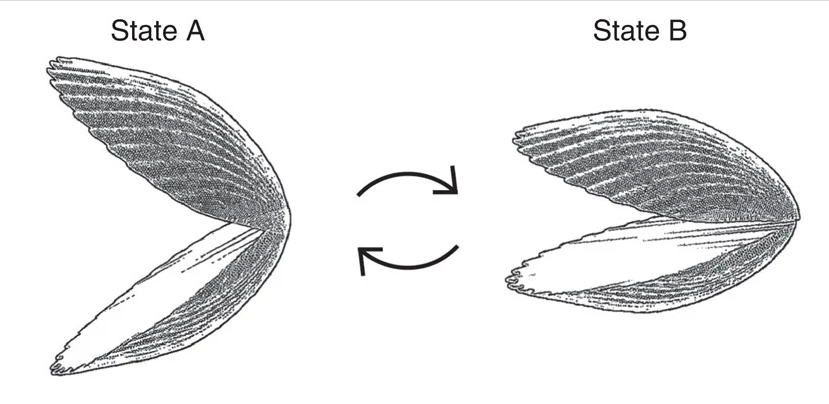
Purcell's swimming scallop "Fast or slow, it exactly retraces its trajectory and it's back where it started".

$$\mathrm{Re} = \frac{\rho u l}{\mu}$$

Here, ρ represents the density of the fluid; u is a characteristic velocity of the system (for instance, the velocity of a swimming particle); l is a characteristic length scale (e.g., the swimmer size); and μ is the viscosity of the fluid. Taking the suspending fluid to be water, and using experimentally observed values for u, one can determine that inertia is important for macroscopic swimmers like fish (Re = 100), while viscosity dominates the motion of microscale swimmers like bacteria (Re = 10^{−4}).

The overwhelming importance of viscosity for swimming at the micrometer scale has profound implications for swimming strategy. This has been discussed memorably by E. M. Purcell, who invited the reader into the world of microorganisms and theoretically studied the conditions of their motion. In the first place, propulsion strategies of large scale swimmers often involve imparting momentum to the surrounding fluid in periodic discrete events, such as vortex shedding, and coasting between these events through inertia. This cannot be effective for microscale swimmers like bacteria: due to the large viscous damping, the inertial coasting time of a micron-sized object is on the order of 1 μs. The coasting distance of a microorganism moving at a typical speed is about 0.1 angstroms (Å). Purcell concluded that only forces that are exerted in the present moment on a microscale body contribute to its propulsion, so a constant energy conversion method is essential.

Microorganisms have optimized their metabolism for continuous energy production, while purely artificial microswimmers (microrobots) must obtain energy from the environment, since their on-board-storage-capacity is very limited. As a further consequence of the continuous dissipation of energy, biological and artificial microswimmers do not obey the laws of equilibrium statistical physics, and need to be described by non-equilibrium dynamics. Mathematically, Purcell explored the implications of low Reynolds number by taking the Navier-Stokes equation and eliminating the inertial terms:

$$\begin{align} \mu \nabla^2 \mathbf{u} -\boldsymbol{\nabla}p &= \boldsymbol{0} \\ \end{align}$$

where $\mathbf{u}$ is the velocity of the fluid and $\boldsymbol{\nabla} p$ is the gradient of the pressure. As Purcell noted, the resulting equation — the Stokes equation — contains no explicit time dependence. This has some important consequences for how a suspended body (e.g., a bacterium) can swim through periodic mechanical motions or deformations (e.g., of a flagellum). First, the rate of motion is practically irrelevant for the motion of the microswimmer and of the surrounding fluid: changing the rate of motion will change the scale of the velocities of the fluid and of the microswimmer, but it will not change the pattern of fluid flow. Secondly, reversing the direction of mechanical motion will simply reverse all velocities in the system. These properties of the Stokes equation severely restrict the range of feasible swimming strategies.

As a concrete illustration, consider a mathematical scallop that consists of two rigid pieces connected by a hinge. Can the "scallop" swim by periodically opening and closing the hinge? No: regardless of how the cycle of opening and closing depends on time, the scallop will always return to its starting point at the end of the cycle. Here originated the striking quote: "Fast or slow, it exactly retraces its trajectory and it's back where it started". In light of this scallop theorem, Purcell developed approaches concerning how artificial motion at the micro scale can be generated. This paper continues to inspire ongoing scientific discussion; for example, recent work by the Fischer group from the Max Planck Institute for Intelligent Systems experimentally confirmed that the scallop principle is only valid for Newtonian fluids.

== Physics ==
As discussed in the previous section, the motion of microswimmers is controlled by viscosity, meaning the motion is drag-dominant. In addition, the scallop theorem demonstrates microswimmers are unable to rely on time-dependence for movement, requiring them to have more than one degree of freedom. Derivations for the parallel and normal components of drag on simple geometries in creeping flow can be found in literature, and recorded media, notably in spheres:

$F_{sphere}= 6\pi\mu u r$

and spheroids with major and minor axis a, b:

$F_{parallel}= 6 \pi \left ( \frac{4 + a/b}{5} \right )$

$F_{perpendicular}= 6 \pi \left ( \frac{3 + 2 a/b}{5} \right )$

Due to the linear nature of the governing fluid equations, the superposition principle may be used to model more complex geometries, such as corkscrews, following the analysis of Purcell and others. For example, the drag and torque on the helical coil is as follows:

$$\begin{bmatrix} F \\ T \end{bmatrix}=\begin{bmatrix} a & b \\ b & c \end{bmatrix} \begin{bmatrix} u \\ \omega \end{bmatrix}$$

$a = 2 \pi n \sigma\left ( \frac{\xi_{\parallel}\cos^2(\theta)+\xi_{\perp}\sin^2(\theta)}{\sin(\theta)} \right )$

$b=2 \pi n \sigma^2 (\xi_{\parallel}-\xi_{\perp})\cos(\alpha)$

$c = 2 \pi n \sigma^3 \left ( \frac{\xi_{\parallel}\sin^2(\theta)+\xi_{\perp}\cos^2(\theta)}{\sin(\theta)} \right )$

$\xi_{\parallel}=\frac{2\pi\mu}{\ln\left ( \frac{0.36\pi\sigma}{r\sin(\theta)} \right )} ,\xi_{\perp}=\frac{4\pi\mu}{\ln\left ( \frac{0.36\pi\sigma}{r\sin(\theta)+0.5} \right )}$

Where $\theta= \arctan(\frac{2\pi\sigma}{\lambda})$. While the scallop theorem requires more than one degree of freedom, external forcing (e.g., magnetic) allows for the motion of a simple corkscrew.

== Types ==
Different types of microswimmers are powered and actuated in different ways. Swimming strategies for individual microswimmers as well as swarms of microswimmers have been examined down through the years. Typically, microswimmers rely either on external power sources, as it is the case for magnetic, optic, or acoustic control, or employ the fuel available in their surroundings, as is the case with biohybrid or catalytic microswimmers. Magnetic and acoustic actuation are typically compatible with in vivo microswimmer manipulation and catalytic microswimmers can be specifically engineered to employ in vivo fuels. The use of optical forces in biological fluids or in vivo is more challenging, but interesting examples have nevertheless been demonstrated.

Often, researchers choose to take inspiration from nature, either for the entire microswimmer design, or for achieving a desired propulsion type. For example, one of the first bioinspired microswimmers consisted of human red blood cells modified with a flagellum-like artificial component made of filaments of magnetic particles bonded via biotin–streptavidin interactions. More recently, biomimetic swimming inspired by worm-like travelling wave features, shrimp locomotion, and bacterial run-and-tumble motion, was demonstrated by using shaped light.

A different nature-inspired approach is the use of biohybrid microswimmers. These comprise a living component and a synthetic one. Biohybrids most often take advantage of the microscale motion of various biological systems and can also make use of other behaviours characterising the living component. For magnetic bioinspired and biohybrid microswimmers, typical model organisms are bacteria, sperm cells and magnetotactic cells. In addition to the use of magnetic forces, actuation of bioinspired microswimmers was also demonstrated using e.g., acoustic excitation or optical forces. Another nature-inspired behavior related to optical forces is that of phototaxis, which can be exploited by e.g., cargo-carrying microorganisms, synthetic microswimmers or biohybrid microswimmers. A number of recent review papers are focused on explaining or comparing existing propulsion and control strategies used in microswimmer actuation. Magnetic actuation is most often included for controlled in vivo guiding, even for microswimmers which rely on a different type of propulsion. In 2020, Koleoso et al. reviewed the use of magnetic small scale robots for biomedical applications and provide details about the various magnetic fields and actuation systems developed for such purposes.

Strategies for the fabrication of microswimmers include two-photon polymerisation 3D printing, photolithography, template-assisted electrodeposition, or bonding of a living component to an inanimate one by exploiting different strategies. More recent approaches exploit 4D printing, which is the 3D printing of stimuli-responsive materials. Further functionalization is often required, either to enable a certain type of actuation, e.g., metal coating for magnetic control or thermoplasmonic responses, or as part of the application, if certain characteristics are required for e.g., sensing, cargo transport, controlled interactions with the environment, or biodegradation.

Microswimmers can also be categorized by their propulsion methods, and two primary methods are used: self-propulsion and external-field propulsion. In self-propulsion, a chemical fuel is coated over the robot that reacts with the liquid environment to create bubbles that propel the robot. External-field propulsion offers more variety, using optical, magnetic, acoustic, or electric fields. External field is better suited for biological applications as it will not need chemical fuels that produce pollutants that may be harmful to the host that the microswimmers are servicing including films and chemicals that may be biocompatible. This propulsive method also provides higher spatial resolution and more controllability, with recent advancements enabling three-dimensional movement enhancing the flexibility and functionality of microswimmers.

== Natural microswimmers ==
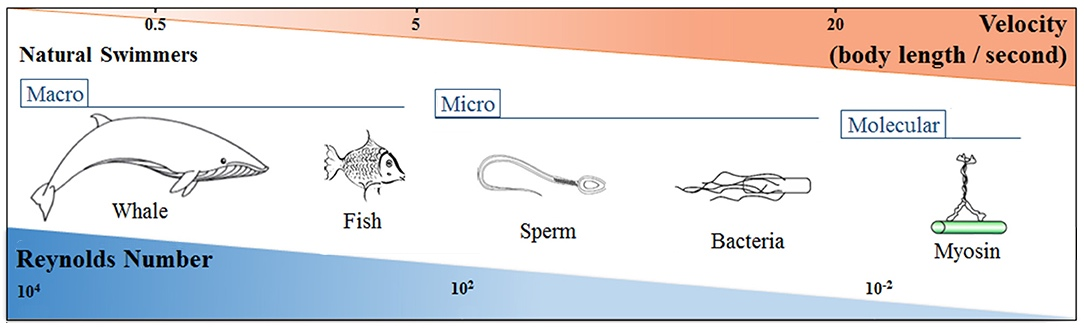
Changes in speed and Reynolds number with length of swimmer

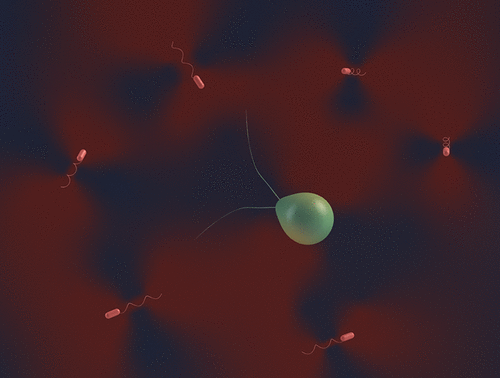
Natural microswimmers Drawing of Chlamydomonas reinhardtii alga in a co-culture with Escherichia coli bacteria

Motile systems have developed in the natural world over time and length scales spanning several orders of magnitude, and have evolved anatomically and physiologically to attain optimal strategies for self-propulsion and overcome the implications of high viscosity forces and Brownian motion, as shown in the diagram on the right.

Some of the smallest known natural motile systems are motor proteins, i.e., proteins and protein complexes present in cells that carry out a variety of physiological functions by transducing chemical energy into mechanical energy. These motor proteins are classified as myosins, kinesins, or dyneins. Myosin motors are responsible for muscle contractions and the transport of cargousing actin filaments as tracks. Dynein motors and kinesin motors, on the other hand, use microtubules to transport vesicles across the cell. The mechanism these protein motors use to convert chemical energy into movement depends on ATP hydrolysis, which leads to a conformation modification in the globular motor domain, leading to directed motion.

Apart from motor proteins, enzymes, traditionally recognized for their catalytic functions in biochemical processes, can function as nanoscale machines that convert chemical energy into mechanical action at the molecular dimension. Diffusion of various enzymes (e.g. urease, and catalase), measured by fluorescent correlated spectroscopy (FCS), increases in a substrate-dependent manner. Moreover, when enzymes are membrane-bound, their catalytic actions can drive lipid vesicle movement. For instance, lipid vesicles integrated with enzymes such as transmembrane adenosine 5'-triphosphatase, membrane-bound acid phosphatase, or urease exhibit enhanced mobility correlating with the enzymatic turnover rate. Through an enzyme cascade, a single initial substrate of enzyme can orchestrate the dynamics of separate enzyme-attached microswimmer populations, facilitating enhanced diffusion and positive chemotaxis.

Bacteria can be roughly divided into two fundamentally different groups, gram-positive and gram-negative bacteria, distinguished by the architecture of their cell envelope. In each case the cell envelope is a complex multi-layered structure that protects the cell from its environment. In gram-positive bacteria, the cytoplasmic membrane is only surrounded by a thick cell wall of peptidoglycan. By contrast, the envelope of gram-negative bacteria is more complex and consists (from inside to outside) of the cytoplasmic membrane, a thin layer of peptidoglycan, and an additional outer membrane, also called the lipopolysaccharide layer. Other bacterial cell surface structures range from disorganised slime layers to highly structured capsules. These are made from secreted slimy or sticky polysaccharides or proteins that provide protection for the cells and are in direct contact with the environment. They have other functions, including attachment to solid surfaces. Additionally, protein appendages can be present on the surface: fimbriae and pili can have different lengths and diameters and their functions include adhesion and twitching motility.

Specifically, for microorganisms that live in aqueous environments, locomotion refers to swimming, and hence the world is full of different classes of swimming microorganisms, such as bacteria, spermatozoa, protozoa, and algae. Bacteria move due to rotation of hair-like filaments called flagella, which are anchored to a protein motor complex on the bacteria cell wall.

The following table, based on Schwarz et al., 2017, lists some examples of natural or biological microswimmers.

Motile microorganisms
	Name	Image	Size (μm^{2})a	Speed (μm/s)b	Propulsion mechanism	Natural swimming habitat	Sources
bacterial swimmers (prokaryotes)	Escherichia coli		0.5 × 2	30	Peritrichous bundles	Intestinal flora	
bacterial swimmers (prokaryotes)	Serratia marcescens		1 × 2	50	Peritrichous bundles	Respiratory and urinary tracts (parasitic)	
bacterial swimmers (prokaryotes)	Salmonella typhimurium		0.5 × 2	30	Peritrichous bundles	Intestines (parasitic)	
bacterial swimmers (prokaryotes)	Bacillus subtilis		1 × 3	20	Peritrichous bundles	Intestinal flora	
bacterial swimmers (prokaryotes)	Aliivibrio fischeri		1 × 2	50	Lophotrichous flagella	Mucus (symbiotic)	
bacterial swimmers (prokaryotes)	Vibrio alginolyticus		2 × 3	40	Monotrichous flagellum	Blood (parasitic)	
bacterial swimmers (prokaryotes)	Listeria monocytogenes		0.5 × 1.5	<1	Peritrichous or amphitrichous bundles	Inter- and intracellular (parasitic)	
bacterial swimmers (prokaryotes)	Magnetococcus marinus		2 × 2	200	Two lophotrichous bundles	Marine water	
bacterial swimmers (prokaryotes)	Magnetospirillum gryphiswaldense		0.5 × 2	60	Two amphitrichous flagella	Freshwater sediments	
bacterial swimmers (prokaryotes)	Mycoplasma mobile		0.5 × 0.5	5	Gliding via protrusions	Fish gills (parasitic)	
protist swimmers (unicellular) eukaryotes)	Chlamydomonas		10 × 10	150	Two lophotrichous flagella	Freshwater, soil	
protist swimmers (unicellular) eukaryotes)	Tetrahymena		25 × 50	>500	Holotrichous cilia	Freshwater	
protist swimmers (unicellular) eukaryotes)	Trypanosome		3 × 20	30	Monotrichous flagellum	Blood (parasitic)	
sperm cells	Human		3 × 5	50	Monotrichous flagellum	Reproductive tract	
sperm cells	Bovine		5 × 10	100	Monotrichous flagellum	Reproductive tract	
sperm cells	Murine		3 × 8	120	Monotrichous flagellum	Reproductive tract	

== Synthetic microswimmers ==
"An artificial microswimmer is a cutting-edge technology with engineering and medical applications. A natural microswimmer, such as bacteria and sperm cells, also play important roles in wide varieties of engineering, medical and biological phenomena. Due to the small size of the microswimmer, the inertial effect of the surrounding flow field may be negligible. In such a case, reciprocal body deformation cannot induce migration of a swimmer, which is known as the scallop theorem. To overcome the implications of the scallop theorem, the microswimmer needs to undergo a nonreciprocal body deformation to achieve migration. The swimming strategy is thus completely different from macro-scale swimmers...".

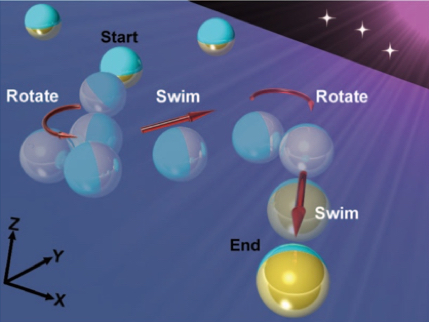
Under light fields, polystyrene/gold Janus particles are set to swim and rotate alternatively such that they follow a predefined path

One of the current engineering challenges is to create miniaturized functional vehicles that can carry out complex tasks at a small scale that would be otherwise impractical, inefficient, or outright impossible by conventional means. These vehicles are termed nano/micromotors or nano/microrobots, and should be distinguished from even smaller molecular machines for energy, computing, or other applications on the one side and static microelectromechanical systems (MEMS) on the other side of this size scale. Rather than being electronic devices on a chip, micromotors are able to move freely through a liquid medium while being steered or directed externally or by intrinsic design, which can be achieved by various mechanisms, most importantly catalytic reactions, magnetic fields, or ultrasonic waves.

There are a variety of sensing, actuating, or pickup-and-delivery applications that scientists are currently aiming for, with local drug targeting for cancer treatment being one of the more prominent examples. For applications like this, a micromotor needs to be able to move, i.e., to swim, freely in three dimensions efficiently controlled and directed with a reliable mechanism.

It is a direct consequence of the small size scale of microswimmers that they have a low Reynolds number. This means the physics of how microswimmers swim is dominated by viscous drag forces, a problem which has been discussed extensively by physicists in the field. This kind of swimming has challenged engineers as it is not commonly experienced in everyday life, but can nonetheless be observed in nature for motile microorganisms like sperm or certain bacteria. Naturally, these microorganisms served as inspiration from the very beginning to create artificial micromotors, as they were able to tackle the challenges that an active, self-sufficient microswimmer vehicle has to face. With biomimetic approaches, researchers were able to imitate the flagella-based motion strategy of sperm and Escherichia coli bacteria by reproducing their respective flagellum shape and actuating it with magnetic fields.

Synthetic microswimmers are designed in a wide variety of shapes depending on the applications that they are used for. Similar to natural microswimmers there is an energy cost associated with the movement and control of a microswimmer. In nature, it is observed that micron-sized bacteria expend very little energy while larger microorganisms expend more energy. This principle can be translated to synthetic microswimmers where the connection between the sizing and shape of a microswimmer and the energy spent has been studied by researchers. Piro et al. argue that needle-like microswimmers are more energy efficient than other shapes, while disk-like microswimmers are carried by flow gradients in the liquid and will be naturally predisposed to follow a time-optimal trajectory. Helical microswimmers have also gained interest as a geometrical shape for microswimmers due to being bioinspired by microstructures within many different types of plants that serve as water vessels.

At the microscale, surface wettability is an important consideration in the material selection due to affecting the locomotion of the microswimmer. Hydrophobic surfaces produce a large contact angle with the liquid which has the effect of exerting less frictional drag torque on the microswimmer body resulting in a lower step-out frequency required for movement.

Microorganisms have adapted their locomotion to the harsh environment of low Reynolds number regime by invoking different swimming strategy. For example, the E. coli moves by rotating its helical flagellum, Chlamydomonas flagella have a breaststroke kind of motion. African trypanosome has a helical flagellum attached to the cell body with a planar wave passing through it. Swimming of these kind of natural swimmers have been investigated for the last half-century. As a result of these studies, artificial swimmers have also been proposed, like Taylor sheet, Purcell's two-hinge swimmer, three-linked spheres swimmer, elastic two-sphere swimmer and three-sphere with a passive elastic arm, which have further enhanced understanding about low Reynolds number swimmers. One of the challenges in proposing an artificial swimmer lies in the fact that the proposed movement stroke should not be reciprocal otherwise it cannot propel itself due to the Scallop theorem. In Scallop theorem, Purcell had argued that a swimmer with one-hinge or one degree of freedom is bound to perform reciprocal motion and thus will not be able to swim in the Stokes regime.

Purcell proposed two possible ways to elude from Scallop theorem, one is 'corkscrew' motion and the other is 'flexible oar' motion. Using the concept of flexible oar, Dreyfus et al reported a micro swimmer that exploit elastic property of a slender filament made up of paramagnetic beads. To break the time inversion symmetry, a passive head was attached to the flexible arm. The passive head reduces the velocity of the flexible swimmer, bigger the head, higher is the drag force experienced by the swimmer. The head is essential for swimming because without it the tail performs a reciprocal motion and the velocity of the swimmer reduces to zero.

In a study by Huang et al. microswimmers were placed in a sucrose solution to represent a viscosity that is similar to blood and tested different microswimmers and their ability to propel within the fluid using variants of the corkscrew and flexible oar techniques at different angles of alignment with an external magnetic field. Due to the misalignment a helical motion was produced for the flexible oar and corkscrew case. Under this test, the propulsion method that performed the fastest was the microswimmer with the tubular body and flexible planar tail due to taking advantage of the helical and corkscrew motion generated at an angle of 30-degree misalignment from the external magnetic field. Microswimmers relying on the corkscrew motion had a reduced speed due to an increase in the drag experienced by the microswimmer due to the wobbling motion on the body. However, when the microswimmer's body is perpendicular to the external magnetic field the mobility of the flexible oar microswimmer was reduced due to a lack of the body's helical motion while the wobbling effect on the corkscrew microswimmer was reduced so it was able to achieve better motion.

The corkscrew and flexible oar motion of a synthetic microswimmer can be largely affected by the viscosity of the fluid. An increase in viscosity decreases the motion of the microswimmer using either method, however, the decrease in movement at higher viscosity is larger for microswimmers using the flexible oar propulsion system. This is due to the reduction in helical motion of the body of the microswimmer causing an increase in the drag experienced by the body. Another effect experienced is a reduction in the bending of the tail which reduces the microswimmer's ability to overcome the time-reversal symmetry.

Another way microswimmers can propel is through catalytic reactions. Taking inspiration from Whitesides, who used the decomposition of hydrogen peroxide (H_{2}O_{2}) to propel cm/mm-scale objects on a water surface, Sen et al. (2004) fabricated catalytic motors in the micrometer range. These microswimmers were rod-shaped particles 370 nm in diameter and consisted of 1 μm long Pt and Au segments. They propelled via the decomposition of hydrogen peroxide in solution which would be catalyzed into water and oxygen. The Pt/Au rods were able to consistently reach speeds of up to 8 μm/s in a solution of 3.3% hydrogen peroxide. The decomposition of hydrogen peroxide in the Pt side produces oxygen, two protons and two electrons. The two protons and electrons will travel towards the Au, where they will be used to react with another hydrogen peroxide molecule, to produce two water molecules. The movements of the two protons and the two electrons through the rod drag the fluid towards the Au side, thus this fluid flow will propel the rod in the opposite direction. This self-electrophoresis mechanism is what powers the motion of these rods. Further analysis of the Pt/Au rods showed that they were capable of performing chemotaxis towards higher hydrogen peroxide concentrations, transport cargo, and exhibited steerable motion in an external magnetic field when inner Ni segments were added.

Interest has been shown in using high-frequency sound waves for microswimmer navigation due to being cleared as safe for clinical studies by the U.S. Food and Drug Administration which would allow them to be used in biomedical applications. The microswimmer is designed to have a hydrophobic surface from being manufactured with a resin and small cavities which produce an air bubble when immersed in a liquid. When the high-frequency sound waves are applied to the microswimmer the bubble produces oscillations and generates enough movement to propel the microswimmer in a controlled direction.

An additional method that microswimmers can travel is through a response to a difference in temperature. Huang et al. designed a microswimmer to study the control of the shape of a 3D microswimmer. The microswimmer contains a rigid, non-expandable poly (ethylene glycol) diacrylate (PEGDA) combined with an N-isopropylacrylamide (NIPAAm) hydrogel layer that is thermally responsive. Within the hydrogel layer, there are magnetic nanoparticles that can control the folding axes. Through the alignment of the magnetic particles along the folding axes, the change in temperature can cause an active control of the microswimmer shape to propel in a fluid. Another example of thermal-based control is through the use of a pNIPAM-AAc hydrogel embedded with iron oxide which can be controlled through a magnetic field. Through the combination of magnetic fields and temperature-responsive materials, a dynamic control can be achieved.

Movement without external forces has been demonstrated for microswimmers. Bioinspired by microvelia beetles which are capable of gliding on the water at high speeds, microswimmers are proposed to take advantage of the Marangoni effect which is the mass transfer across a gradient of the surface tension for a fluid. Choi et al. demonstrated that photopatterned microswimmers without any mechanical actuation system or external force are capable of traversing a fluid through a polyvinyl alcohol (PVA) fuel source which causes the surface tension of the water once it is dissolved.

=== Responding to stimuli ===
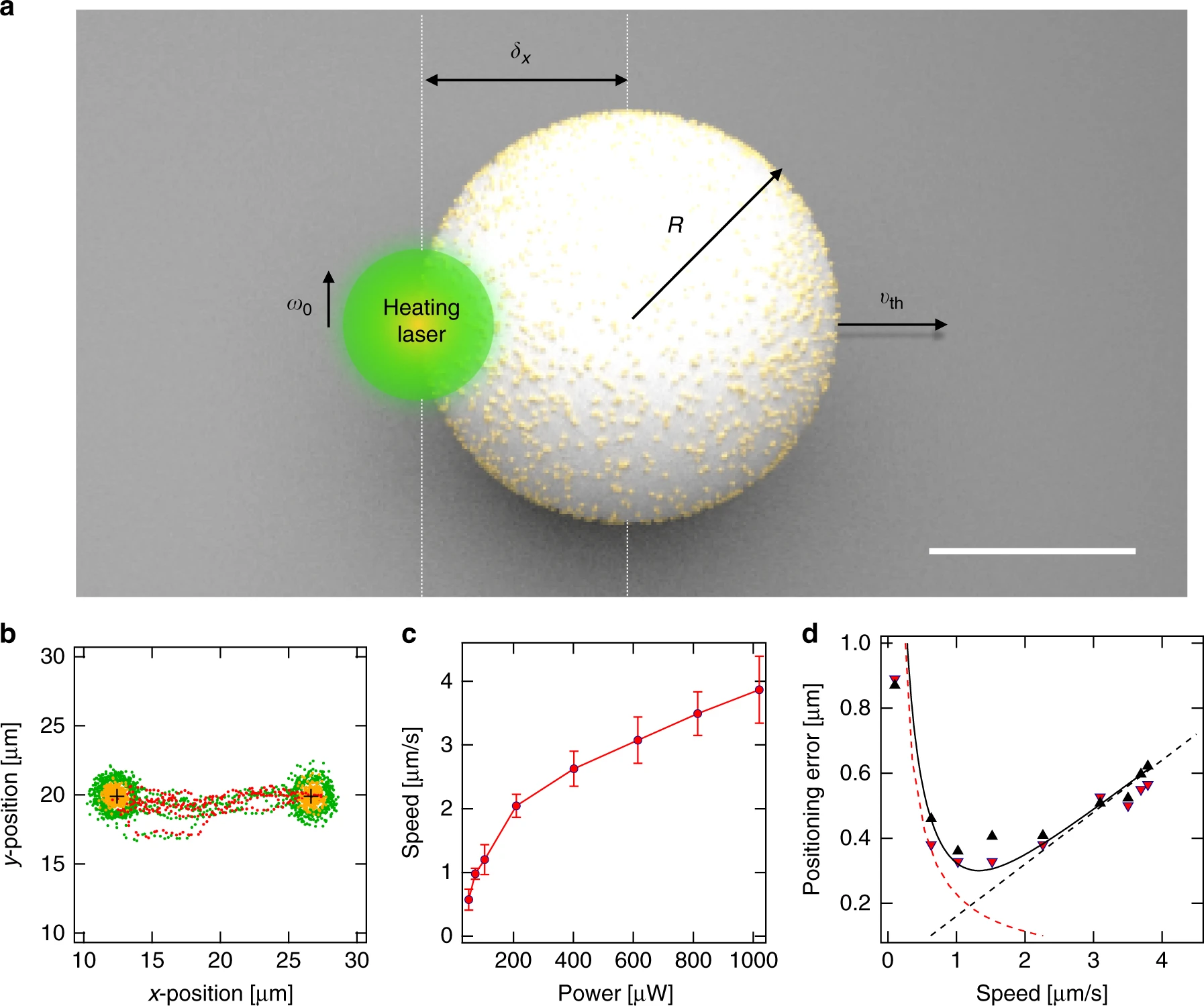
Symmetric self-thermophoretic active particle scale bar has a length of 1 μm

Reconfigurable synthetic or artificial microswimmers need internal feedback Self-propelling microparticles are often proposed as synthetic models for biological microswimmers, yet they lack the internally regulated adaptation of their biological counterparts. Conversely, adaptation can be encoded in larger-scale soft-robotic devices but remains elusive to transfer to the colloidal scale.

The ubiquity and success of motile bacteria are strongly coupled to their ability to autonomously adapt to different environments as they can reconfigure their shape, metabolism, and motility via internal feedback mechanisms. Realizing artificial microswimmers with similar adaptation capabilities and autonomous behavior might substantially impact technologies ranging from optimal transport to sensing and microrobotics. Focusing on adaptation, existing approaches at the colloidal scale mostly rely on external feedback, either to regulate motility via the spatiotemporal modulation of the propulsion velocity and direction or to induce shape changes via the same magnetic or electric fields, which are also driving the particles. On the contrary, endowing artificial microswimmers with an internal feedback mechanism, which regulates motility in response to stimuli that are decoupled from the source of propulsion, remains an elusive task.

A promising route to achieve this goal is to exploit the coupling between particle shape and motility. For example, through simple shape design, platinum micromotors can execute a variety of motion trajectories, from highly linear to orbital, when exposed to hydrogen peroxide. Efficient switching between different propulsion states can, for instance, be reached by the spontaneous aggregation of symmetry-breaking active clusters of varying geometry, albeit this process does not have the desired deterministic control. Conversely, designing colloidal clusters with fixed shapes and compositions offers fine control on motility but lacks adaptation. Although progress on reconfigurable robots at the sub-millimeter scale has been made, downscaling these concepts to the colloidal level demands alternative fabrication and design. Shape-shifting colloidal clusters reconfiguring along a predefined pathway in response to local stimuli would combine both characteristics, with high potential toward the vision of realising adaptive artificial microswimmers.

== Biohybrid microswimmers ==
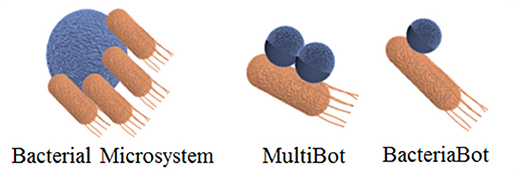
Types of bacterial biohybrid microswimmers

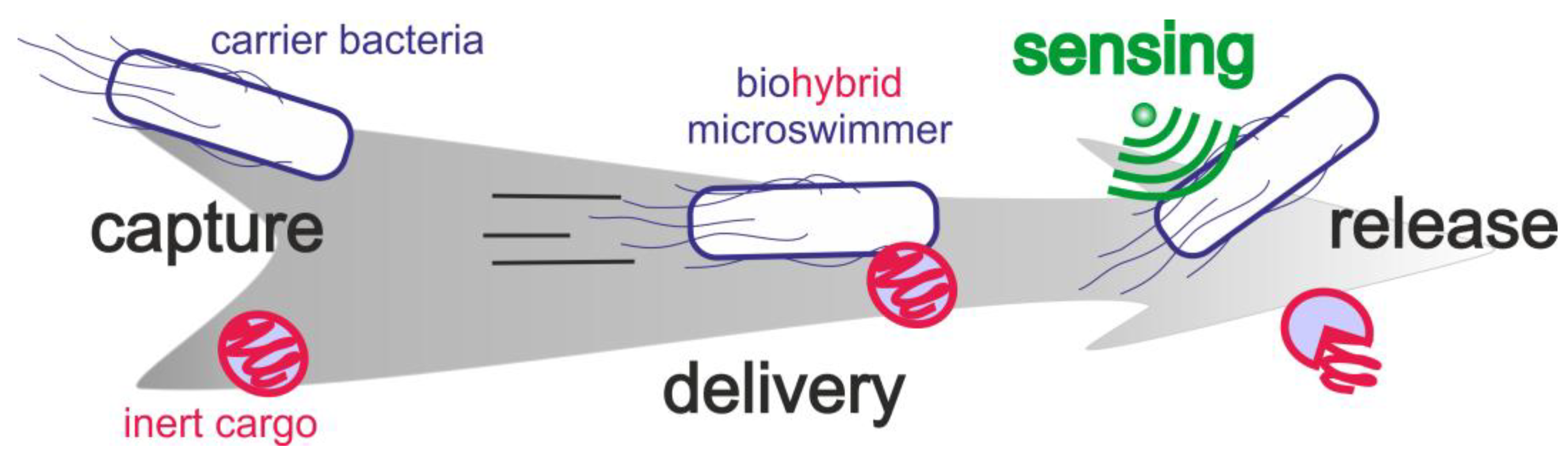
Bacterial biohybrid microswimmers development capture, delivery, sensing, and release

The so-called biohybrid microswimmer can be defined as a microswimmer that consist of both biological and artificial parts, for instance, one or several living microorganisms attached to one or various synthetic parts. The biohybrid approach directly employs living microorganisms to be a main component or modified base of a functional microswimmer. Initially microorganisms were used as the motor units for artificial devices, but in recent years this role has been extended and modified toward other functionalities that take advantage of the biological capabilities of these organisms considering their means of interacting with other cells and living matter, specifically for applications inside the human body like drug delivery or fertilisation.

A distinct advantage of microorganisms is that they naturally integrate motility and various biological functions in a conveniently miniaturised package, coupled with autonomous sensing and decision-making capabilities. They are able to adapt and thrive in complex in vivo environments and are capable of self-repair and self-assembly upon interaction with their surroundings. In that sense, self-sufficient microorganisms naturally function very similar to what we envision for artificially created microrobots: They harvest chemical energy from their surroundings to power molecular motor proteins that serve as actuators, they employ ion channels and microtubular networks to act as intracellular wiring, they rely on RNA or DNA as memory for control algorithms, and they feature an array of various membrane proteins to sense and evaluate their surroundings. All these abilities act together to allow microbes to thrive and pursue their goal and function. In principle, these abilities also qualify them as biological microrobots for novel operations like theranostics, the combination of diagnosis and therapy, if we are able to impose such functions artificially, for example, by functionalisation with therapeutics. Further, artificial extensions may be used as handles for external control and supervision mechanisms or to enhance the microbe's performance to guide and tailor its functions for specific applications.

In fact, the biohybrid approach can be conceived in a dualistic way, with respect to the three basic ingredients of an in vivo microrobot, which are motility, control, and functionality. Figure 1 illustrates how these three ingredients can be either realized biologically, i.e., by the microorganism, or artificially, i.e., by the synthetic component. For example, a hybrid biomicromotor based on a sperm cell can be driven by the flagellum of the sperm or by an attached artificial helical flagellum. It can orient itself autonomously via biological interactions with its surroundings and other cells, or be controlled and supervised externally via artificial sensors and actuators. Finally, it can carry out a biological function, like its inherent ability to fertilize an egg cell, or an artificially imposed function, like the delivery of synthetic drugs or DNA vectors. A biohybrid device may deploy any feasible combination of such biological and artificial components in order to carry out a specific application.

Another example of the biohybrid approach is by designing a microswimmer that is designed for studying skeletal muscle stimulation. The microswimmer is fabricated from an Iron Oxide nanoparticles being dip-coated with chlorella microalgae allowing for the microrobot to be used in different biological environments while still having a high degree of control due to the superparamagnetic nanoparticles. Guided by an external magnetic field the microswimmer is capable of reaching its target. The microswimmer can be safely irradiated with a near-infrared (NIR) laser causing the nanoparticles to be heated through a photothermal effect and to trigger a targeted contraction in the skeletal muscle. This technique demonstrates a safe and controllable method for movement within a biological environment.

== Navigation ==
Hydrodynamics can determine the optimal route for microswimmer navigation Compared to the well explored problem of how to steer a macroscopic agent, like an airplane or a Moon lander, to optimally reach a target, optimal navigation strategies for microswimmers experiencing hydrodynamic interactions with walls and obstacles are far-less understood. Furthermore, hydrodynamic interactions in suspensions of microswimmers produce complex behavior. The quest on how to navigate or steer to optimally reach a target is important, e.g., for airplanes to save fuel while facing complex wind patterns on their way to a remote destination, or for the coordination of the motion of the parts of a space-agent to safely land on the Moon. These classical problems are well-explored and are usually solved using optimal control theory. Likewise, navigation and search strategies are frequently encountered in a plethora of biological systems, including the foraging of animals for food, or of T cells searching for targets to mount an immune response.

There is growing interest in optimal navigation problems and search strategies of microswimmers and "dry" active Brownian particles, The general problem regarding the optimal trajectory of a microswimmer which can freely steer but cannot control its speed toward a predefined target (point-to-point navigation) can be referred to as "the optimal microswimmer navigation problem". The characteristic differences between the optimal microswimmer navigation problem and conventional optimal control problems for macroagents like airplanes, cruise-ships, or moon-landers root in the presence of a low-Reynolds-number solvent in the former problem only. They comprise (i) overdamped dynamics, (ii) thermal fluctuations, and (iii) long-ranged fluid-mediated hydrodynamic interactions with interfaces, walls, and obstacles, all of which are characteristic for microswimmers. In particular, the non-conservative hydrodynamic forces which microswimmers experience call for a distinct navigation strategy than the conservative gravitational forces acting, e.g. on space vehicles. Recent work has explored optimal navigation problems of dry active particles (and particles in external flow fields) accounting for (i) and partly also for (ii). Specifically recent research has pioneered the use of reinforcement learning such as determining optimal steering strategies of active particles to optimally navigate toward a target position or to exploit external flow fields to avoid getting trapped in certain flow structures by learning smart gravitaxis. Deep reinforcement learning has been used to explore microswimmer navigation problems in mazes and obstacle arrays assuming global or only local knowledge of the environment. Analytical approaches to optimal active particle navigation complement these works and allow testing machine-learned results.

An example of a successful machine learning locomotion being used in navigation is by Zou et al. where it was inspired by microorganisms having the ability to naturally switch between locomotory gaits such as a run-and-tumble or a roll-and-flick motion depending on the need to navigate the environment. The artificial intelligence system allowed for the development of distinct gaits for steering, transition, and translational movement.

== Applications ==
As is the case for microtechnology and nanotechnology in general, the history of microswimmer applications arguably starts with Richard Feynman's famous lecture There's Plenty of Room at the Bottom. In the visionary speech, among other topics, Feynman addressed the idea of microscopic surgeons, saying: "...it would be interesting in surgery if you could swallow the surgeon. You put the mechanical surgeon inside the blood vessel and it goes into the heart and <<looks>> around (of course the information has to be fed out). It finds out which valve is the faulty one and takes a little knife and slices it out. Other small machines might be permanently incorporated in the body to assist some inadequately-functioning organ." The concept of the surgeon one could swallow was soon after presented in the science-fiction movie Fantastic Voyage and in Isaac Asimov's writings.

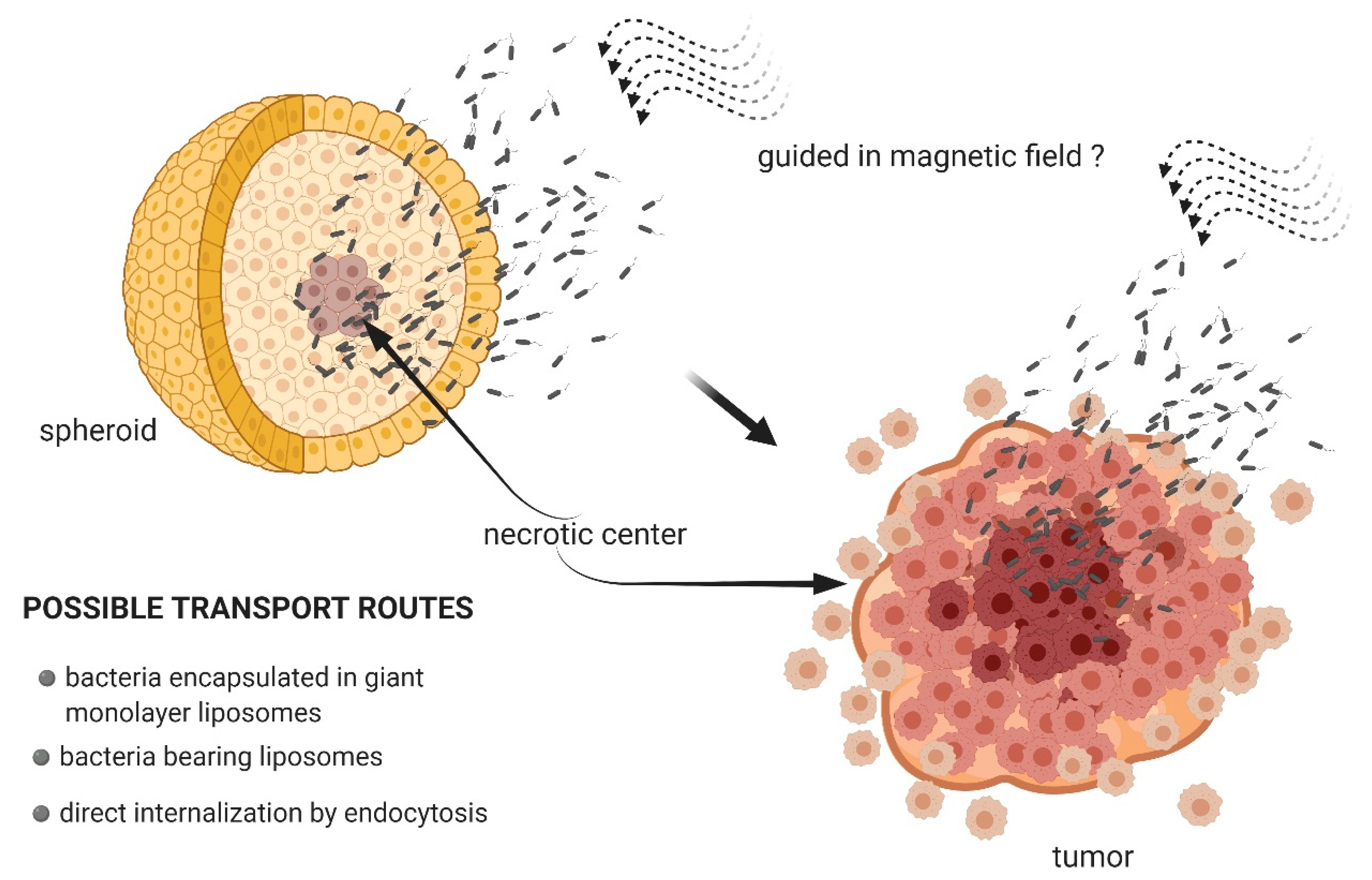
Magnetotactic bacteria, such as Magnetococcus marinus, as potential drug-carriers capable of penetrating a tumour

The collective behavior of microswimmers in response to environmental stimuli allows them to perform diverse functions and offer remarkable applications. Only a few decades later, microswimmers aiming to become true microscale surgeons evolved from an intriguing science-fiction concept to a reality explored in many research laboratories around the world, as already highlighted by Metin Sitti in 2009. These active agents that can self-propel in a low Reynolds number environment might play a key role in the future of nanomedicine, as popularised in 2016 by Yuval Noah Harari in Homo Deus: A Brief History of Tomorrow. In particular, they might become useful for the targeted delivery of genes or drugs and other cargo to a certain target (e.g. a cancer cell) through our blood vessels, requiring them to find a good, or ideally optimal, path toward the target avoiding, e.g., obstacles and unfortunate flow field regions.

Already in 2010, Nelson et al. reviewed the existing and envisioned applications of microrobots in minimally invasive medicine. Since then, the field has grown, and it has become clear that microswimmers have much potential for biomedical applications. Already, many interesting tasks can be performed in vitro using tailored microswimmers. Still, as of 2020, a number of challenges regarding in vivo control, biocompatibility and long-term biosafety need to be overcome before microswimmers can become a viable option for many clinical applications.

A schematic representation of the classification of biomedical applications is shown in the diagram on the left below. This includes the use of microswimmers for cargo transport in drug delivery and other biomedical applications, as well as assisted fertilisation, sensing, micromanipulation and imaging. Some of the more complex microswimmers fit into multiple categories, as they are applied simultaneously for e.g., sensing and drug delivery.

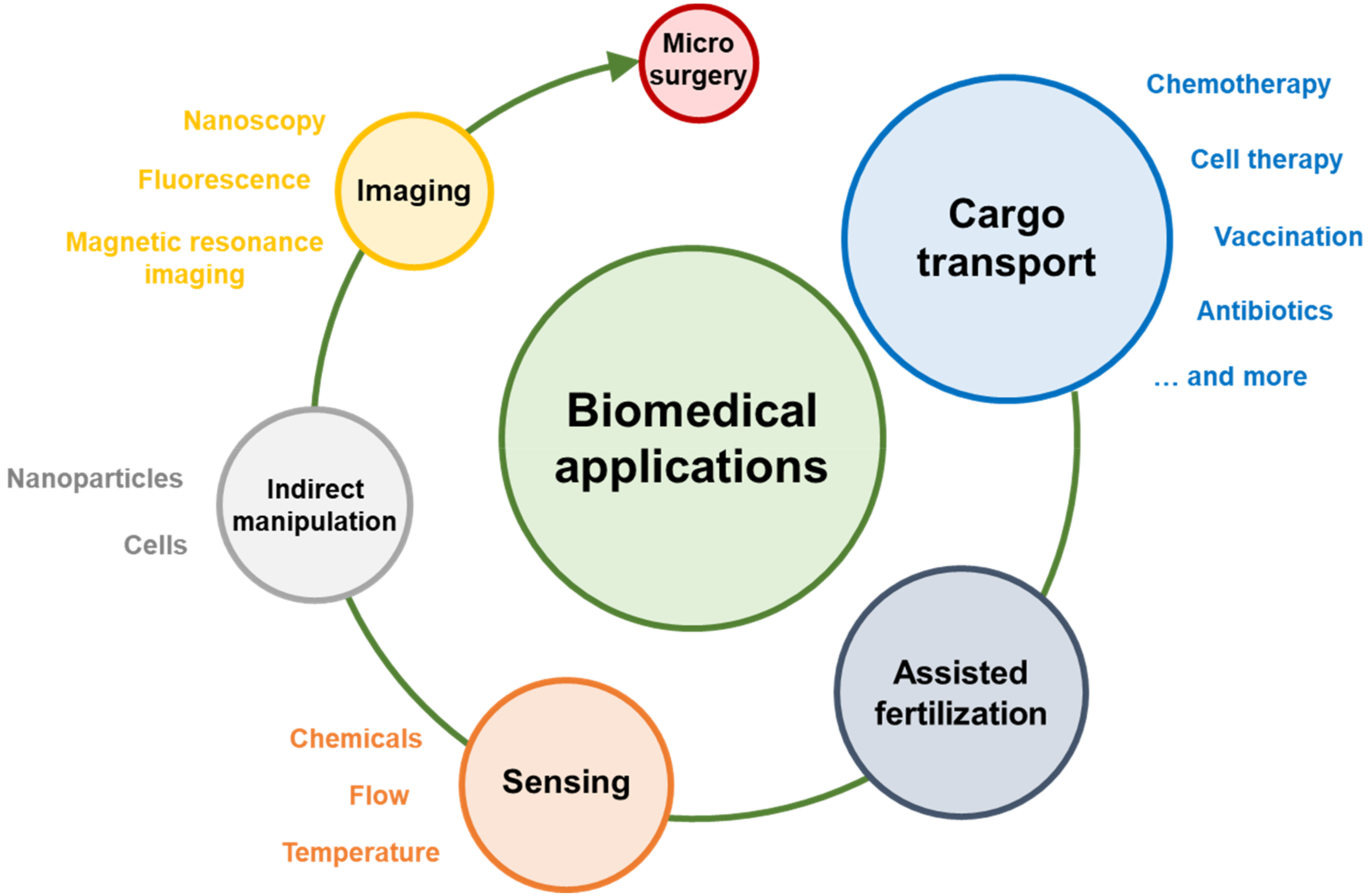
Biomedical applications of microswimmers

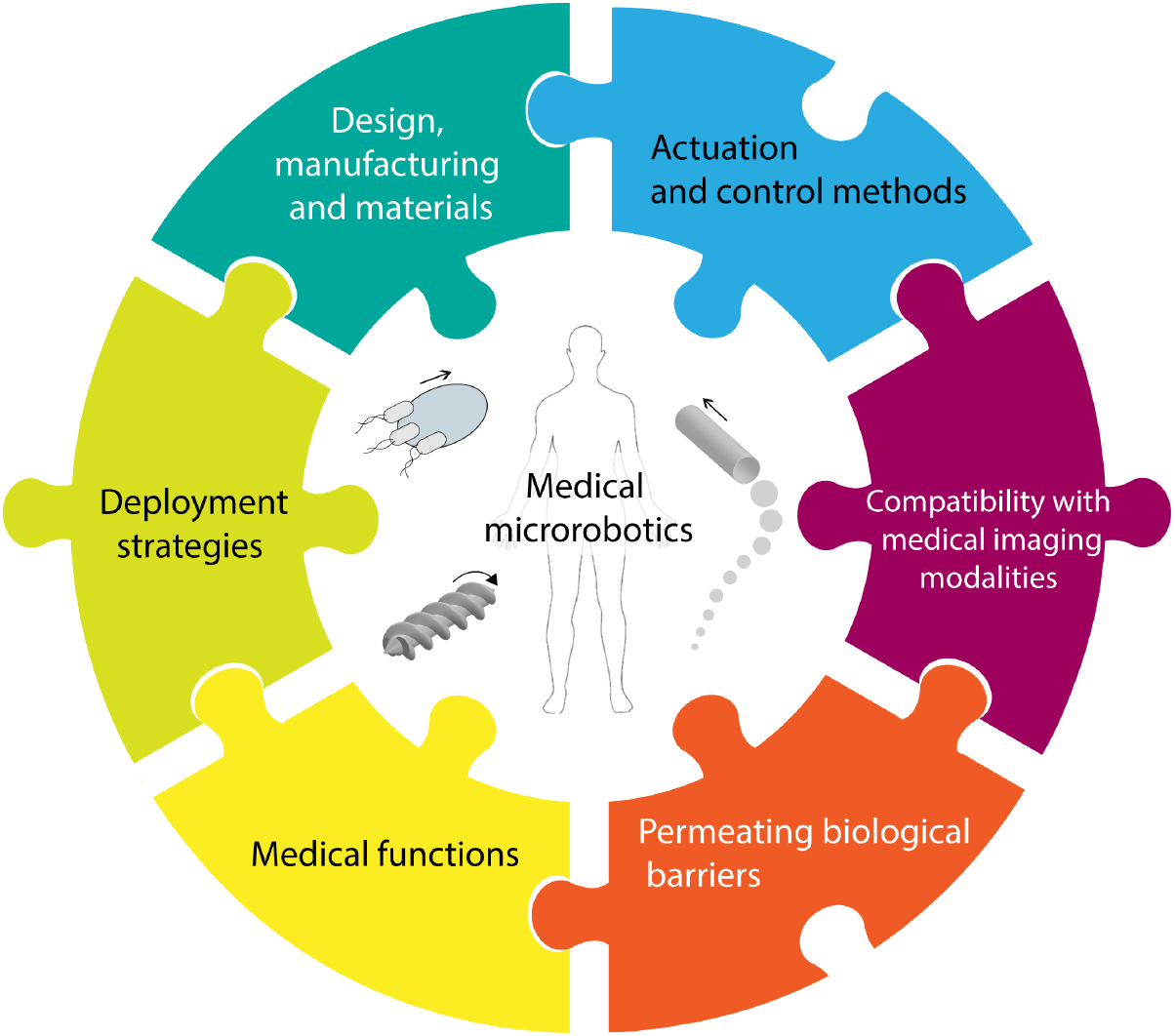
Essentials for a microswimmer to function with medical interventional capabilities

The design of an untethered microscopic mobile machine or microrobot to function in vivo with medical interventional capabilities should assume an integrated approach where design 3D body shape, material composition, manufacturing technique, deployment strategy, actuation and control methods, imaging modality, permeation of biological barriers, and the execution of the prescribed medical tasks need to be considered altogether, as illustrated in the diagram on the right above. Each of these essential aspects contains a special design consideration, which must be reflected at the physical design of the microrobot.

Delivering therapeutic agents to precise locations in deep tissue remains a significant challenge since magnetic actuation becomes less effective as the magnetic flux density weakens farther away from the electromagnetic control platform. Biohybrid microswimmers have demonstrated promise in drug delivery, capable of precise drug delivery to deep tissue cancer tumors, and one such example is magnetostatic bacteria. Magnetostatic bacteria (MTB) were discovered in the 1970s, and since then, their mechanism and dynamics have been heavily studied. Microaerophilic alphaproteobacterium Magnetospirillum gryphiswaldense is one of the most well-characterized magnetostatic bacteria, and it contains a prominent amount of magnetite Fe_{3}O_{4} which acts internal compass that guides the bacteria with the surrounding magnetic field. A recent study by Mirkhani N, et al. demonstrated drug delivery using rotating magnetic fields (RMF) controlled magnetostatic bacteria (MTB) on a mouse tumor model. RMF concentrates magnetic torque density within specific regions by inducing a magnetostatic selection field with a field-free point or field-free line. Experimental validation using the mouse tumor model has confirmed the efficacy of the RMF control in enhancing the translational velocity and the penetration of MTB into deep tissues. This strategy holds the potential for systemic drug delivery with heightened spatial selectivity.

Another proposed application is for microswimmers to help improve the protection of the environment by reducing the amount of waste and pollutants in different parts of the environment. Some examples of pollutants that can be reduced or removed from the field include microplastics, oil-based chemicals, and other waste. A wide variety of microswimmers are being developed in research labs for this purpose using different variants of actuation systems using different multiphysics including light, magnetic, and chemical gradients. One example is the removal of Bisphenol A (BPA) which is a common waste product from factories producing plastics-based products. One example is a microswimmer developed by Dekanovsky et al. using a Mxene-based microswimmer which is controlled by light. The propulsion system has two components one being the Mxene component grafted with nanoparticles and an iron oxide layer. The components within the propulsion system produce a chemical reaction with BPA where the products produce oxygen bubbles which can propel the microswimmer forward. Research is being conducted on designing synthetic microswimmers to react with other waste chemicals to reduce pollution in the environment. Many of the current synthetic microswimmers are being designed to use a multiphysics propulsion system with a magnetic force along with a chemical or optical-based system.

== See also ==
- Bioinspiration
- Bio-inspired robotics
- Bio-inspired engineering
- Gray goo
- Robotic sperm
- Soft robotics
- Squirmer
