= Harold Irving Ewen =

American scientist

- Born: March 5, 1922; Chicopee, Massachusetts
- Died: October 8, 2015 (aged 93)
- Education: Ph.D. (1951)
- Alma mater: Harvard University
- Known for: Detection of 21-cm hydrogen line
- Spouse: Mary Ann Whitney
- Children: 8 (Donald, Bruce, Mark, Deborah, David, Daniel, Rebecca, and James)
- Parents: S. Arthur Ewen (father); Ruth F. Fay (mother)
- Awards: IEEE Morris E. Leeds Award (1970); Beatrice M. Tinsley Prize (1988)
- Scientific career
- Thesis: Radiation from Galactic Hydrogen at 1420 Megacycles per Second (1951)
- Doctoral advisor: Edward M. Purcell

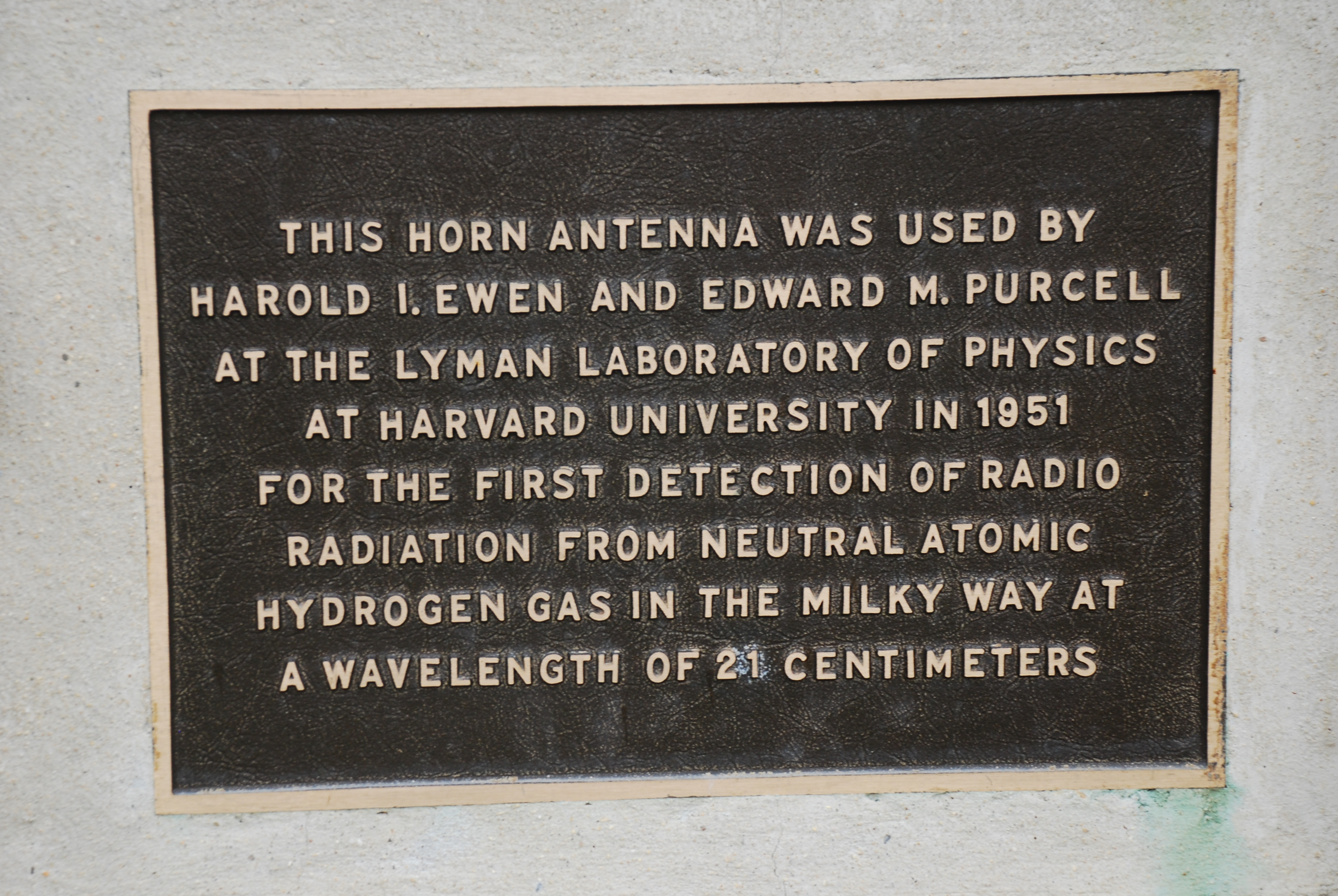
Plaque commemorating the discovery of 21-cm radiation from the Milky Way

Harold Irving "Doc" Ewen (March 5, 1922 – October 8, 2015) was an American physicist, radio astronomer, and business executive. He served in the United States Navy in World War II as a second lieutenant. As a graduate student under Edward M. Purcell, he was the first to detect the galactic 21-cm hydrogen line.

== Biography ==
Ewen was born on March 5, 1922, in Chicopee, Massachusetts, son of S. Arthur Ewen and Ruth F. Fay. After an education at the Technical High School in Springfield, Massachusetts, he matriculated at Amherst College, studying undergraduate mathematics and astronomy, and was awarded a B.A. in 1943. With World War II underway, he joined the Navy. Initially, he taught celestial navigation at Amherst as part of a pilot training program. Ewen received training in electronics and radar technology at Princeton University and MIT, then joined Navy airborne squadron 112, based in England, as a radar officer with the rank of Second Lieutenant.

Following the war, Ewen began graduate studies at Harvard on the G.I. Bill, pursuing a degree in physics. He participated in the development of the 95-inch Harvard Cyclotron. Edward M. Purcell suggested that Ewen study prior work on the hyperfine line of neutral hydrogen. As a naval reserve officer, Ewen was able to obtain a translation of a 1945 paper by the Dutch astronomer H. C. van de Hulst on the subject. Van de Hulst expressed pessimism that such a signal would be detectable. Nonetheless, Ewen and Purcell agreed that his thesis topic should be to construct a microwave spectrometer to find a lower limit on the detectability of the 21-cm hydrogen line.

With a $500 grant from the AAA&S, Ewen was able to purchase components to construct a pyramidal horn antenna and a 21-cm receiver. With the instrument assembled, a galactic 21-cm signal was successfully detected on March 25, 1951. This unexpected result was soon confirmed by Dutch and Australian astronomers. Ewen was able to defend his thesis in May of that year, and he was awarded a Ph.D. from Harvard. He joined the Harvard Business School to pursue an MBA.

=== Career ===
In the fall of 1951, Ewen was called up to serve in the Korean War. He remained for a month before negotiating his return to civilian life. He joined with Bart Bok as directors of the newly founded Harvard radio astronomy program during 1952–1958, creating the nation's first Ph.D. program in this new field. During the 1950s, Ewen was involved in the planning for a national radio astronomy facility, and the site search for what would eventually become the Green Bank Telescope observatory.

Ewen joined with his friend Geoff Knight to launch the Ewen Knight Corporation in 1952, which was established to construct a hydrogen line receiver for Harvard at the Agassiz Station. This company became a major supplier of equipment for radio observatories, including the NRAO. In 1956 he was married to Mary Ann Whitney; the couple would have seven children. Ewen was elected to the American Academy of Arts and Sciences in 1957. He founded the Ewen Dae Corporation in 1958, whose name was a play on [k]night and day and also became the initials of the couple's first child.

Ewen devised a sextant-like radio direction finder that was used on submarines to find the position before firing missiles. During 1989-1992 he was executive vice president at the Millitech Corporation, becoming vice president for special projects, 1993–2000. At Millitech Corporation he was instrumental in winning and leading many significant programs. These included several space programs, most notably Submillimeter Wave Astronomy Satellite (SWAS). SWAS was designed to study the chemical composition, energy balance and structure of interstellar clouds, both galactic and extragalactic, and investigate the processes of stellar and planetary formation. Ewen was also a pioneer in millimeter-wave passive imaging for multitude of applications, including weapon detection, defense and radioastronomy. He served as president of E.K. Associates starting in 1992. In 2001, he became a research professor at the University of Massachusetts. Following his retirement, on November 12, 2002, Ewen gave the inaugural Gordon Lecture at the Arecibo Observatory. He was the technical operations director of Special Projects LLC in 2004.

In 1970, Ewen was given the IEEE Morris E. Leeds Award "for contributions to the design of sensitive radiometric systems, and for the codiscovery of the 21-cm spectral line of interstellar hydrogen". Ewen and Purcell were awarded the Beatrice M. Tinsley Prize in 1988 for the "first detection of 21-cm hyperfine transition radiation of neutral hydrogen". The horn antenna used to detect the galaxy's 21-cm line from Harvard is now a historical marker.
