= Edward Mills Purcell =

American physicist (1912–1997)

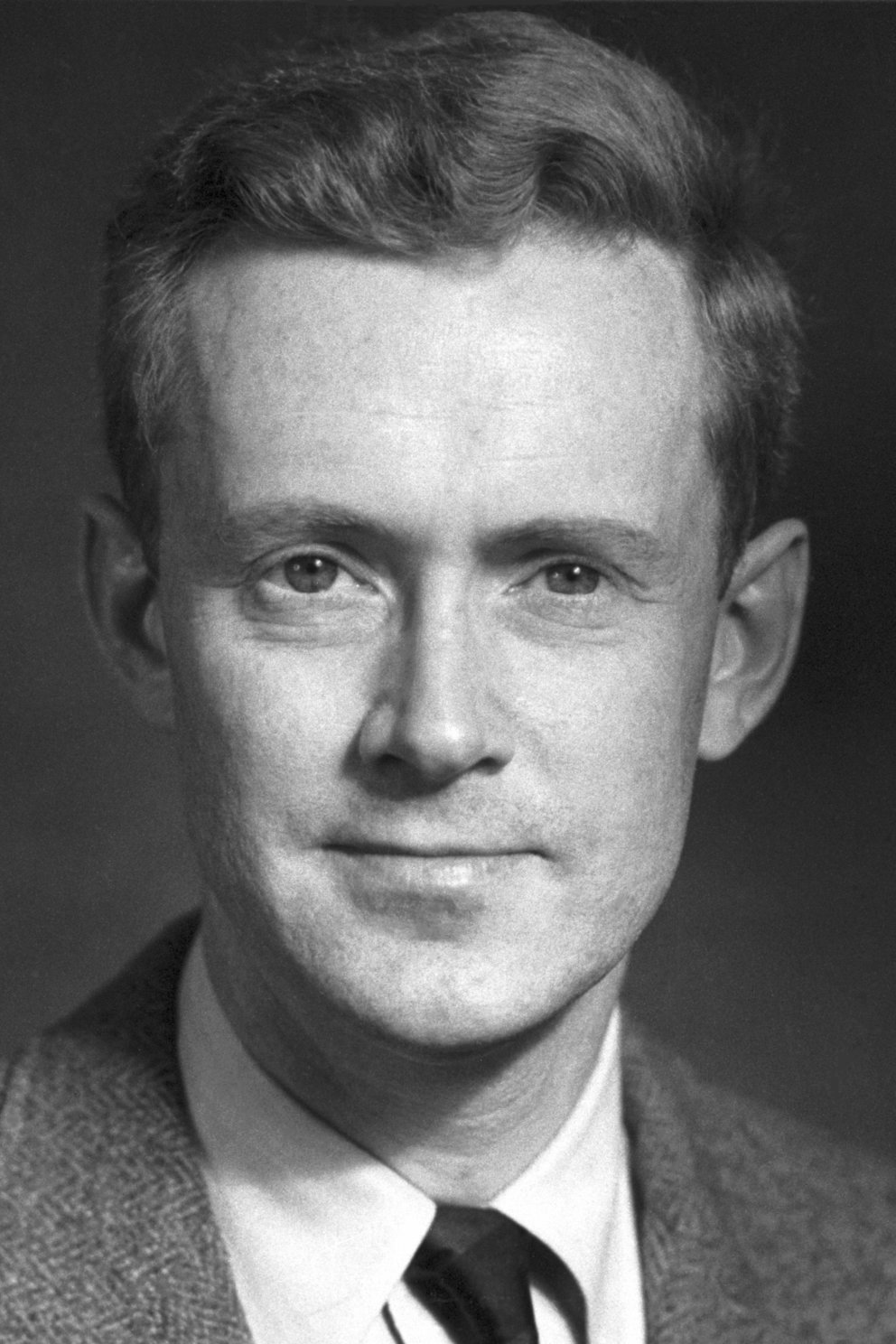
- Purcell in 1952
- Born: 30 August 1912; Taylorville, Illinois, U.S.
- Died: 7 March 1997 (aged 84); Cambridge, Massachusetts, U.S.
- Education: Purdue University (BSEE); Harvard University (MA, PhD)
- Known for: Nuclear magnetic resonance spectroscopy; 21 cm line; Microswimmer; Scallop theorem; Purcell effect; Smith–Purcell effect
- Scientific career
- Fields: Physics
- Workplaces: Harvard University; Massachusetts Institute of Technology
- Thesis: The Focusing of Charged Particles by a Spherical Condenser (1938)
- Doctoral advisor: Kenneth Bainbridge
- Other academic advisors: John Van Vleck
- Doctoral students: George Benedek; George Pake; Charles Pence Slichter
- Other notable students: Nicolaas Bloembergen; Julie Fouquet

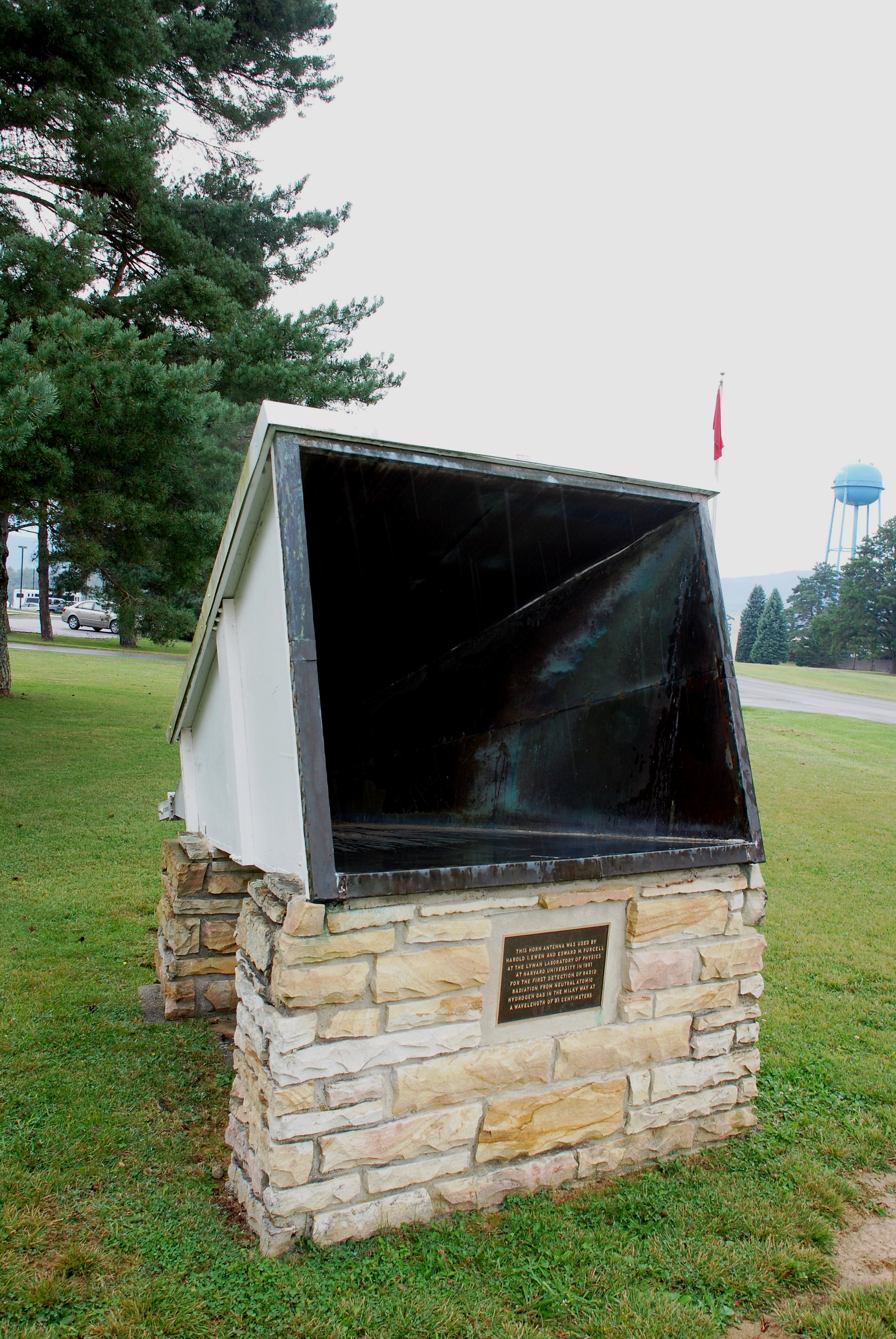
Horn antenna used by Harold I. Ewen and Edward M. Purcell in the Lyman Laboratory of Physics at Harvard University in 1951 for the first detection of radio radiation from nuclear atomic hydrogen gas in the Milky Way at a wavelength of 21 cm. Now at National Radio Astronomy Observatory.

Edward Mills Purcell (August 30, 1912 – March 7, 1997) was an American physicist who shared the 1952 Nobel Prize in Physics with Felix Bloch for his independent discovery (published 1946) of nuclear magnetic resonance (NMR) in liquids and in solids. NMR has become widely used to study the molecular structure of pure materials and the composition of mixtures. Friends and colleagues knew him as Ed Purcell.

== Biography ==
Edward Mills Purcell was born on August 30, 1912, in Taylorville, Illinois, the son of Edward A. Purcell and Mary Elizabeth Mills. Purcell received his B.S. in Electrical Engineering from Purdue University in 1933, followed by his M.A. (1935) and his Ph.D. (1938) in Physics from Harvard University. He was a member of the Alpha Xi chapter of the Phi Kappa Sigma fraternity while at Purdue.

After spending the years of World War II working at the MIT Radiation Laboratory on the development of microwave radar, Purcell returned to Harvard to do research. In December 1945, he discovered nuclear magnetic resonance (NMR) with his colleagues Robert Pound and Henry Torrey. NMR provides scientists with an elegant and precise way of determining chemical structure and properties of materials, and is widely used in physics and chemistry. It also is the basis of magnetic resonance imaging (MRI), one of the most important medical advances of the 20th century. For his discovery of NMR, Purcell shared the 1952 Nobel Prize in physics with Felix Bloch of Stanford University.

Purcell also made contributions to astronomy as the first to detect radio emissions from neutral galactic hydrogen (the famous 21 cm line due to hyperfine splitting), affording the first views of the spiral arms of the Milky Way. This observation helped launch the field of radio astronomy, and measurements of the 21 cm line are still an important technique in modern astronomy. He has also made seminal contributions to solid state physics, with studies of spin-echo relaxation, nuclear magnetic relaxation, and negative spin temperature (important in the development of the laser). With Norman F. Ramsey, he was the first to question the CP symmetry of particle physics.

In 1963 Purcell was appointed to head up the US government's eponymous Purcell Panel to "consider future reconnaissance operations, with particular emphasis on satellite reconnaissance".

Purcell was the recipient of many awards for his scientific, educational, and civic work. He served as science advisor to Presidents Dwight D. Eisenhower, John F. Kennedy, and Lyndon B. Johnson. He was president of the American Physical Society, and a member of the American Philosophical Society, the National Academy of Sciences, and the American Academy of Arts and Sciences. He was awarded the National Medal of Science in 1979, and the Jansky Lectureship before the National Radio Astronomy Observatory. Purcell was also inducted into his Fraternity's (Phi Kappa Sigma) Hall of Fame as the first Phi Kap ever to receive a Nobel Prize.

Purcell was the author of the innovative introductory text Electricity and Magnetism. The book, a Sputnik-era project funded by an NSF grant, was influential for its use of relativity in the presentation of the subject at this level. The 1965 edition, now freely available due to a condition of the federal grant, was originally published as a volume of the Berkeley Physics Course. The book is also in print as a commercial third edition, as Purcell and Morin. Purcell is also remembered by biologists for his famous lecture "Life at Low Reynolds Number", in which he explained forces and effects dominating in limiting flow regimes (often at the micro scale). He also emphasized the time-reversibility of low Reynolds number flows with a principle referred to as the Scallop theorem.

Purcell died on March 7, 1997, in Cambridge, Massachusetts, aged 84.

== Recognition ==
=== Memberships ===
Year	Organization	Type	Ref.
1950	(United States) American Academy of Arts and Sciences	Member	
1951	(United States) National Academy of Sciences	Member	
1954	(United States) American Philosophical Society	Member	
1989	(United Kingdom) Royal Society	Foreign member	

=== Awards ===
Year	Organization	Award	Citation	Ref.
1952	(Sweden) Royal Swedish Academy of Sciences	Nobel Prize in Physics (Note: Shared with Felix Bloch.)	"For their development of new methods for nuclear magnetic precision measurements and discoveries in connection therewith."	
1967	(United States) AAPT	Oersted Medal	—	
1984	(United States) American Physical Society	Max Delbruck Prize	"For the elucidation of complex biological phenomena, in particular chemotaxis and bacterial locomotion, through simple but penetrating physical theories and brilliant experiments."	
1988	(United States) American Astronomical Society	Beatrice M. Tinsley Prize (Note: Shared with Harold Irving Ewen.)	—	

=== National awards ===
Year	Head of state	Award	Citation	Ref.
1979	(United States) Jimmy Carter	National Medal of Science	"For contributions to nuclear magnetic resonance in condensed matter and the measurement of interstellar magnetic fields."	

== See also ==
- Dynamical decoupling
- J-coupling
- Magnetic resonance imaging (MRI)
- Neutron electric dipole moment
- Spin echo
- Relativistic electromagnetism
- List of textbooks in electromagnetism
