= Takeo Wada =

Japanese mathematician

Takeo Wada (Japanese: 和田健雄, Hepburn: Wada Takeo, 1882–1944) was a Japanese mathematician at Kyoto University working in analysis and topology. He suggested the Lakes of Wada to Kunizo Yoneyama, who wrote about them and named them after Wada.

== Publications ==
- Wada, Takeo (1912), "The conception of a curve", The Memoirs of the College of Science and Engineering, Kyoto Imperial University, 3 (9): 265–275
