= Kunizo Yoneyama =

Japanese mathematician

Kunizō Yoneyama (米山 国蔵, 1877–1968) was a Japanese mathematician at Kyoto University working in topology. In 1917, he published the construction of the Lakes of Wada, which he named after his teacher Takeo Wada, to whom he credited the discovery.

== Publications ==
- Yoneyama, Kunizô (1917), "Theory of Continuous Set of Points (not finished)", Tôhoku Mathematical Journal, 12: 43–158
- Yoneyama, Kunizô (1918), "Theory of Continuous Set of Points", Tôhoku Mathematical Journal, 13: 33–157
- Yoneyama, Kunizô (1920), "On Continuous Set of Points, II", Tôhoku Mathematical Journal, 18: 134–186
