= Hénon–Heiles system =

Mathematical model of particle motion

Contour plot of the Hénon–Heiles potential

The Hénon-Heiles system is a nonlinear mathematical model that describes the motion of a particle in a two-dimensional potential. It was introduced in 1964 by astronomers Michel Hénon and Carl Heiles to study the dynamics of stars in a galaxy. Still, it has become an example in the study of nonlinear dynamical systems, Hamiltonian chaos, and celestial mechanics.

While at Princeton University in 1962, Michel Hénon and Carl Heiles worked on the non-linear motion of a star around a galactic center with the motion restricted to a plane. In 1964, they published an article titled "The applicability of the third integral of motion: Some numerical experiments". Their original idea was to find a third integral of motion in a galactic dynamics. For this purpose, they considered a simplified two-dimensional, nonlinear, rotational symmetric potential and found that the third integral existed only for a limited number of initial conditions.

In the modern perspective, the initial conditions that do not have the third integral of motion are called chaotic orbits.

== Introduction ==
The Hénon–Heiles potential can be expressed as

$$V(x,y) = \frac{1}{2}(x^2 + y^2) + \lambda \left(x^2y - \frac{y^3}{3}\right).$$

The Hénon–Heiles Hamiltonian can be written as

$$H = \frac12 (p_x^2 + p_y^2) + \frac{1}{2}(x^2 + y^2) + \lambda \left(x^2y - \frac{y^3}{3}\right).$$

The Hénon–Heiles system (HHS) is defined by the following four equations:

$$\dot{x} = p_x,$$
$$\dot{p_x} = -x - 2\lambda xy,$$
$$\dot{y} = p_y,$$
$$\dot{p_y} = -y - \lambda(x^2 - y^2).$$

In the classical chaos community, the value of the parameter $\lambda$ is usually taken as unity. Since HHS is specified in $\R^2$, we need a Hamiltonian with 2 degrees of freedom to model it. It can be solved for some cases using Painlevé analysis.

== Quantum Hénon–Heiles Hamiltonian ==
In the quantum case, the Hénon–Heiles Hamiltonian can be written as a two-dimensional Schrödinger equation.

The corresponding two-dimensional Schrödinger equation is given by

$$i\hbar\frac{\partial}{\partial t} \Psi(x,y) = \left[ \frac{-\hbar^2}{2m}\nabla^2 + \frac12 (x^2 + y^2 ) + \lambda \left(x^2 y - \frac13 y^3\right) \right] \Psi(x,y).$$

== Wada property of the exit basins ==
Hénon–Heiles system shows rich dynamical behavior. Usually, the Wada property cannot be seen in the Hamiltonian system, but Hénon–Heiles exit basin shows an interesting Wada property. It can be seen that when the energy is greater than the critical energy, the Hénon–Heiles system has three exit basins. In 2001 M. A. F. Sanjuán et al. had shown that in the Hénon–Heiles system, the exit basins have the Wada property.
