= Universe =

Everything in space and time

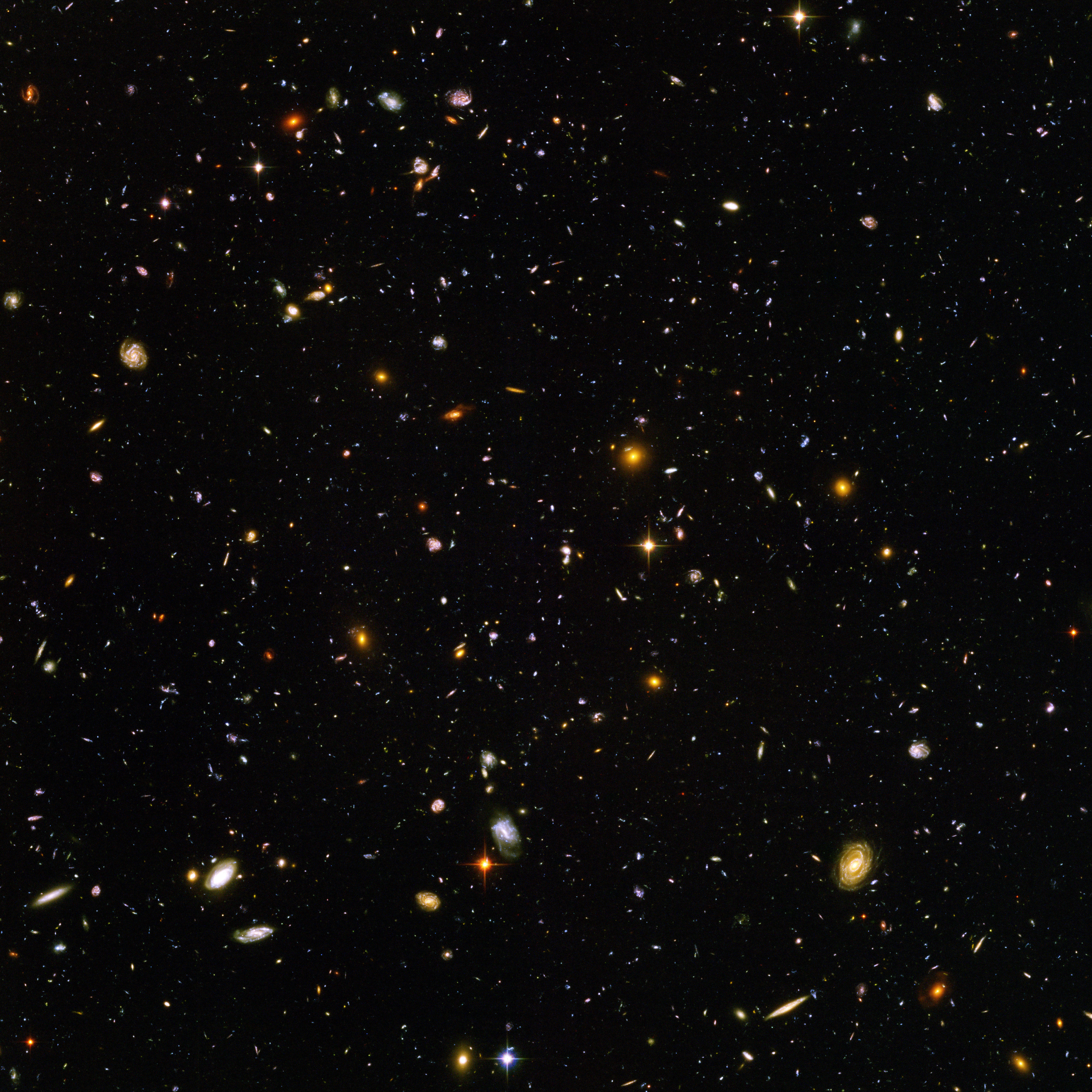
- The Hubble Ultra-Deep Field image shows some of the most remote galaxies visible to present technology (diagonal is ~1/10 apparent Moon diameter)
- Age: 13.787 ± 0.020 billion years
- Observable diameter: 8.8×10^{26} m (28.5 Gpc or 93 Gly)
- Average density (with energy): 9.9×10^{−27} kg/m^{3}
- Average temperature: 2.72548 K (−270.4 °C, −454.8 °F)
- Main contents: Ordinary (baryonic) matter (4.9%); Dark matter (26.8%); Dark energy (68.3%)
- Shape: Flat with 0.4% error margin

The universe comprises all of existence: all forms of matter and energy in space and time, and the structures they form, from subatomic particles to entire galactic filaments. Since the early 20th century, the field of cosmology has established that the universe has been expanding and cooling for 13.8 billion years, starting from an event called the Big Bang. The observable portion of the universe is approximately 93 billion light-years in diameter at present. The total size of the universe is not known.

Some of the earliest cosmological models of the universe were geocentric, placing Earth at the center. During the Scientific Revolution, astronomical observations led to a heliocentric model. Further observational improvements led to the realization that the Sun is one of a few hundred billion stars in the Milky Way, which is one of a few hundred billion galaxies in the observable universe. At the largest scale, galaxies are distributed uniformly and the same in all directions. At smaller scales, galaxies are distributed in clusters and superclusters, which form immense filaments and voids in space, creating a vast foam-like structure. Discoveries in the early 20th century, including general relativity, led to the modern view of an expanding universe. Evidence accumulated supporting the Big Bang theory: an initial hot state that cooled and became less dense as the universe expanded, allowing the first subatomic particles and simple atoms to form. Giant clouds of hydrogen and helium were gradually drawn to the places where matter was most dense, forming the first galaxies, stars, and eventually, everything else.

From studying the effects of gravity on both matter and light, it has been discovered that the universe contains much more matter than is accounted for by visible objects; stars, galaxies, nebulae and interstellar gas. This unseen matter is known as dark matter. In the widely accepted ΛCDM cosmological model, dark matter accounts for about 25.8%±1.1% of the mass and energy in the universe while about 69.2%±1.2% is dark energy, a mysterious form of energy responsible for the acceleration of the expansion of the universe. Ordinary ('baryonic') matter therefore composes only 4.84%±0.1% of the universe. Stars, planets, and visible gas clouds only form about 6% of this ordinary matter.

There are many competing hypotheses about the ultimate fate of the universe and about what, if anything, preceded the Big Bang.

== Definition and related terms ==
Hubble Space Telescope – Ultra-Deep Field galaxies to Legacy field zoom out (video 00:50; May 2, 2019)

The universe contains all energy and matter, including therefore planets, moons, stars, galaxies, and the contents of intergalactic space. In the broadest sense, the physical universe has been defined as "The totality of all space and time; all that is, has been, and will be." More restrictive definitions include the condition that the universe is connected, to allow for the possibility of other mutually existing universes.

In philosophy, one of the meanings of the word nature—the opposite of supernatural, metaphysical, or unreal—coincides with the meaning the universe. Universe is also one of several meanings of world.

=== Etymology ===
The word universe derives from the Old French word univers, which in turn derives from the Latin word universus, meaning 'combined into one'. The Latin word 'universum' was used by Cicero and later Latin authors in many of the same senses as the modern English word is used.

=== Synonyms ===
A term for universe among the ancient Greek philosophers from Pythagoras onwards was τὸ πᾶν (tò pân) 'the all', defined as all matter and all space, and τὸ ὅλον (tò hólon) 'all things', which did not necessarily include the void. Another synonym was ὁ κόσμος (ho kósmos) meaning 'the world, the cosmos'. Synonyms are also found in Latin authors (totum, mundus, natura) and survive in modern languages, e.g., the German words Das All, Weltall, and Natur for universe. The synonyms found in English, include the cosmos and the world.

== Chronology and the Big Bang ==
The prevailing model for the evolution of the universe is the Big Bang theory. In the Big Bang model, the earliest state of the universe was extremely hot and dense but the universe cooled during subsequent expansion. The model is based on general relativity and on symmetry assumptions such as the homogeneity and isotropy of space. A version of the model with a cosmological constant (Lambda) and cold dark matter, known as the Lambda-CDM model, provides an excellent account of most observations of the universe.

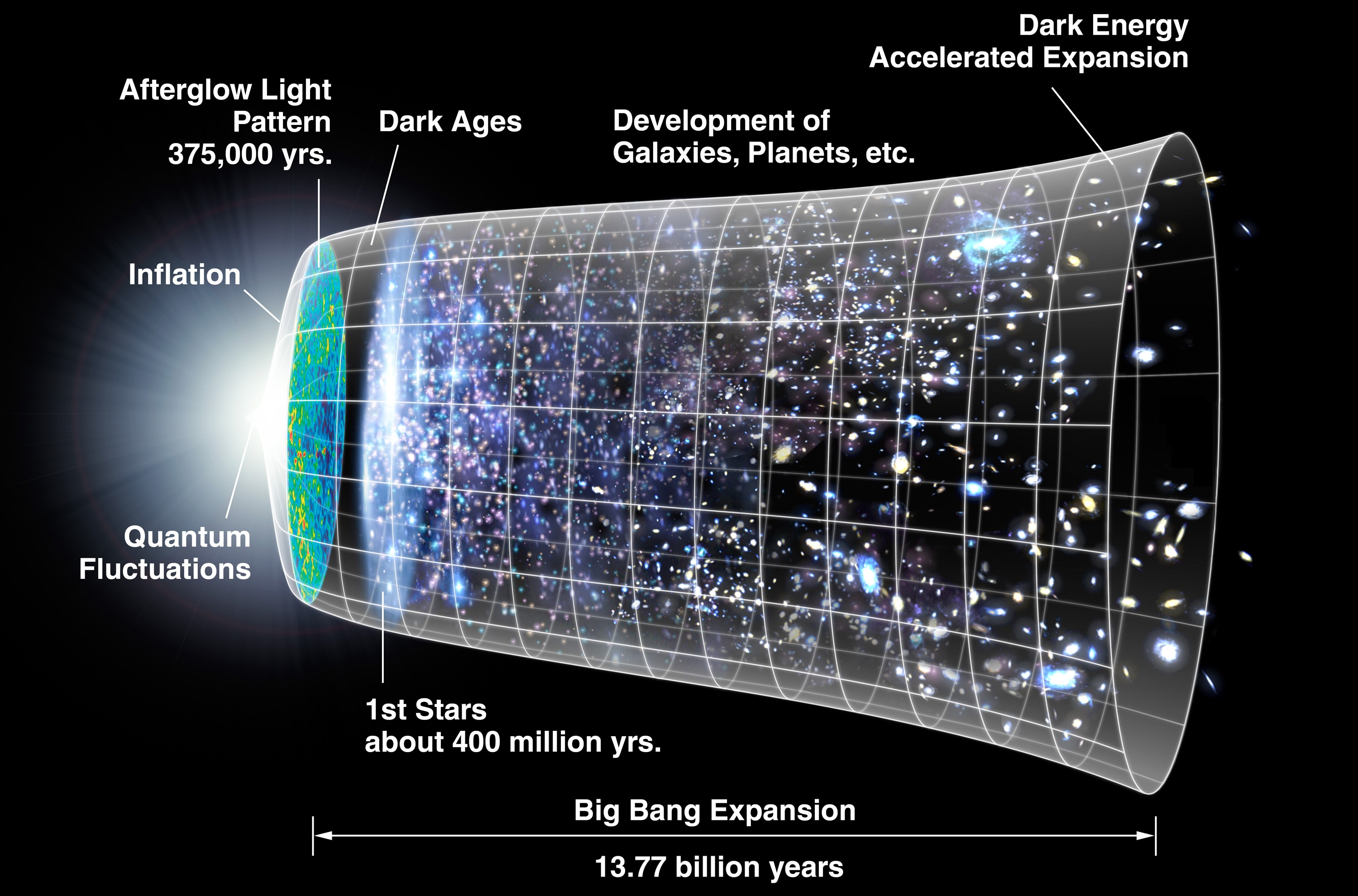
In this schematic diagram, time passes from left to right, with the universe represented by a disk-shaped "slice" at any given time. Time and size are not to scale. To make the early stages visible, the time to the afterglow stage (really the first 0.003%) is stretched and the subsequent expansion (really by 1,100 times to the present) is largely suppressed.

Much of very earliest time is not understood. An intense period of expansion called cosmic inflation is postulated to explain many astronomical observations and set the initial conditions for the Lambda-CDM model.

Within the first fraction of a second of the universe's existence, it was extremely dense, and the high energy meant all the particles of the Standard Model were in equilibrium. As the universe cooled due to expansion, the state of the universe went through phase transitions analogous to water freezing. Various types of elementary particles associated stably producing a plasma of electrons, protons, and neutrons, with very energetic photons preventing them from binding until about one minute after the Big Bang.

During the next few minutes, some protons and neutrons combined to form atomic nuclei through nuclear fusion. This process, known as Big Bang nucleosynthesis, lasted for about 15 minutes, produced helium, with small amounts of deuterium (a form of hydrogen) and traces of lithium. No other nuclei formed in significant amounts during this time. All of the neutrons that did not fuse decayed in to protons and electrons.

After nucleosynthesis ended, the universe was still far too hot for matter to form neutral atoms, so it contained a hot, dense, optically opaque plasma of negatively charged electrons, neutral neutrinos and positive nuclei. After about 377,000 years, the universe had cooled enough that electrons and nuclei could form the first stable atoms. This is known as recombination for historical reasons; electrons and nuclei were combining for the first time. Unlike plasma, neutral atoms are transparent to many wavelengths of light, so for the first time, the universe also became transparent. The photons released ("decoupled") when these atoms formed can still be seen today; they form the cosmic microwave background (CMB).

As the universe expanded, the energy density of electromagnetic radiation decreased more quickly than that of matter because the energy of each photon decreased as it is cosmologically redshifted. At around 47,000 years, the energy density of matter became larger than that of photons and neutrinos, and began to dominate the large scale behavior of the universe. This marked the end of the radiation-dominated era and the start of the matter-dominated era.

In the earliest stages of the universe, tiny fluctuations within the universe's density led to concentrations of dark matter gradually forming. Ordinary matter, attracted to these by gravity, formed large gas clouds and eventually, stars and galaxies, where the dark matter was most dense, and voids where it was least dense. After around 100–300 million years, the first stars formed, known as Population III stars. These were probably very massive, luminous, non metallic and short-lived. They were responsible for the gradual reionization of the universe between about 200–500 million years and 1 billion years, and also for seeding the universe with elements heavier than helium, through stellar nucleosynthesis.

The universe contains a mysterious energy—possibly a scalar field—called dark energy, the density of which does not change over time. After about 9.8 billion years, the universe had expanded sufficiently so that the density of matter was less than the density of dark energy, marking the beginning of the present dark-energy-dominated era. In this era, the expansion of the universe is accelerating due to dark energy.

== Physical properties ==
The properties of the universe are measured by observational cosmology, a combination of direct observations and observations analyzed in conjunction with models based on general relativity and Einstein's field equations.

=== Size ===
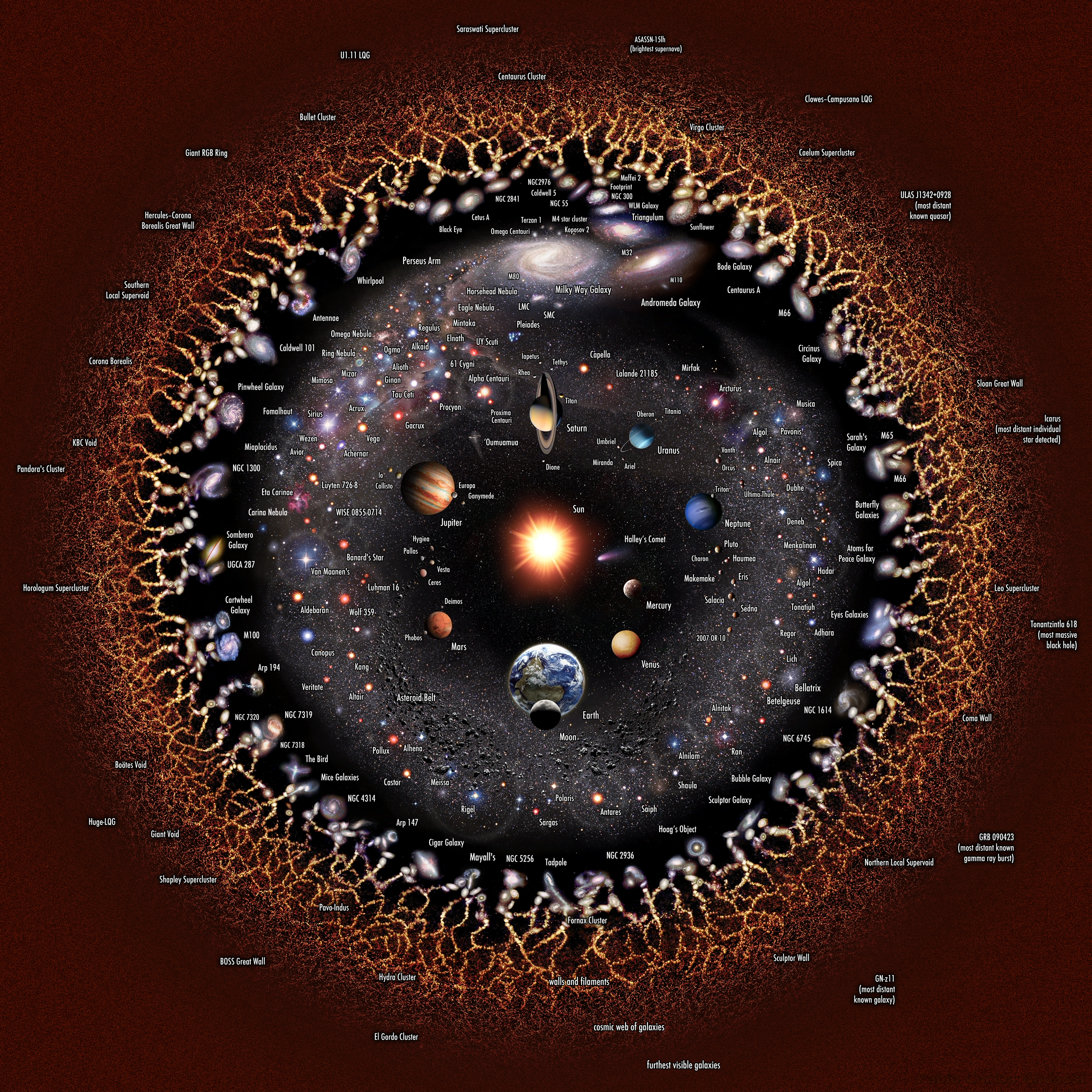
Illustration of the observable universe, centered on the Sun. The distance scale is logarithmic. Due to the finite speed of light, we see more distant parts of the universe at earlier times.

Due to the finite speed of light, there is a limit (known as the particle horizon) to how far light can travel over the age of the universe. The spatial region from which we can receive light is called the observable universe. The proper distance (measured at a fixed time) between Earth and the edge of the observable universe is 46 billion light-years (14 billion parsecs), making the diameter of the observable universe about 93 billion light-years (28 billion parsecs). Although the distance traveled by light from the edge of the observable universe is close to the age of the universe times the speed of light, 13.8 billion light-years (4.2×10^{9} pc), the proper distance is larger because the edge of the observable universe and the Earth have since moved further apart.

For comparison, the Milky Way is roughly 87,400 light-years in diameter, and the nearest sister galaxy to the Milky Way, the Andromeda Galaxy, is located roughly 2.5 million light-years away.

Because humans cannot observe space beyond the edge of the observable universe, it is unknown whether the size of the universe in its totality is finite or infinite.

=== Age and expansion ===
Assuming that the Lambda-CDM model is correct, the measurements of the parameters using a variety of techniques by numerous experiments yield a best value of the age of the universe at 13.799 ± 0.021 billion years, as of 2015.

Over time, the universe and its contents have evolved. For example, the relative population of quasars and galaxies has changed and the universe has expanded. This expansion is inferred from the observation that the light from distant galaxies has been redshifted, which implies that the galaxies are receding from us. Analyses of Type Ia supernovae indicate that the expansion is accelerating.

The more matter there is in the universe, the stronger the mutual gravitational pull of the matter. If the universe were too dense then it would re-collapse into a black hole. However, if the universe contained too little matter then it would expand too quickly for astronomical structures, like galaxies or planets, to form. Since the Big Bang, the universe has expanded monotonically. The mass–energy density of the universe, equivalent to about 5 protons per cubic meter, allowed it to expand for the last 13.8 billion years, giving time to form the universe as observed today.

There are dynamical forces acting on the particles in the universe which affect the expansion rate. Before 1998, it was expected that the expansion rate would be decreasing as time went on due to the influence of gravitational interactions in the universe; and thus there is an additional observable quantity in the universe called the deceleration parameter, which most cosmologists expected to be positive and related to the matter density of the universe. In 1998, the deceleration parameter was measured by two different groups to be negative, approximately −0.55, which technically implies that the second derivative of the cosmic scale factor $\ddot{a}$ has been positive in the last 5–6 billion years.

=== Spacetime ===
Modern physics regards events as being organized into spacetime. This idea originated with the special theory of relativity, which predicts that if one observer sees two events happening in different places at the same time, a second observer who is moving relative to the first will see those events happening at different times. The two observers will disagree on the time $T$ between the events, and they will disagree about the distance $D$ separating the events, but they will agree on the speed of light $c$, and they will measure the same value for the combination $c^2T^2 - D^2$. The square root of the absolute value of this quantity is called the interval between the two events. The interval expresses how widely separated events are, not just in space or in time, but in the combined setting of spacetime.

The special theory of relativity describes a flat spacetime. Its successor, the general theory of relativity, explains gravity as curvature of spacetime arising due to its energy content. A curved path like an orbit is not the result of a force deflecting a body from an ideal straight-line path, but rather the body's attempt to fall freely through a background that is itself curved by the presence of other masses. A remark by John Archibald Wheeler that has become proverbial among physicists summarizes the theory: "Spacetime tells matter how to move; matter tells spacetime how to curve", and therefore there is no point in considering one without the other. The Newtonian theory of gravity is a good approximation to the predictions of general relativity when gravitational effects are weak and objects are moving slowly compared to the speed of light.

The relation between matter distribution and spacetime curvature is given by the Einstein field equations, which require tensor calculus to express. The universe appears to be a smooth spacetime continuum consisting of three spatial dimensions and one temporal (time) dimension. Therefore, an event in the spacetime of the physical universe can be identified by a set of four coordinates: (x, y, z, t).

=== Shape ===
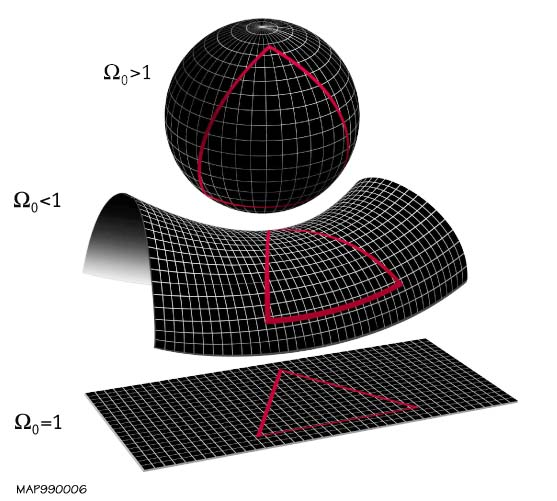
The three possible options for the shape of the universe

Cosmologists often work with space-like slices of spacetime that are surfaces of constant time in comoving coordinates. The geometry of these spatial slices is set by the density parameter, Omega (Ω), defined as the average matter density of the universe divided by a critical value. This selects one of three possible geometries depending on whether Ω is equal to, less than, or greater than 1. These are called, respectively, the flat, open and closed universes.

Observations, including the Cosmic Background Explorer (COBE), Wilkinson Microwave Anisotropy Probe (WMAP), and Planck maps of the CMB, suggest that the universe is infinite in extent with a finite age, as described by the Friedmann–Lemaître–Robertson–Walker (FLRW) models. These FLRW models thus support inflationary models and the standard model of cosmology, describing a flat, homogeneous universe presently dominated by dark matter and dark energy.

=== Support of life ===
The frequency of life in the universe has been a frequent point of investigation in astronomy and astrobiology, being the issue of the Drake equation and the different views on it, from identifying the Fermi paradox, the situation of not having found any signs of extraterrestrial life, to arguments for a biophysical cosmology, a view of life being inherent to the physical cosmology of the universe.

The fine-tuned universe hypothesis is the proposition that the conditions that allow the existence of observable life in the universe can only occur when certain universal fundamental physical constants lie within a very narrow range of values. According to this hypothesis, if any of several fundamental constants were only slightly different, the universe would have been unlikely to be conducive to the establishment and development of matter, astronomical structures, elemental diversity, or life as it is understood. Whether this is true, and whether that question is even logically meaningful to ask, are subjects of much debate. The proposition is discussed among philosophers, scientists, theologians, and proponents of creationism.

== Composition ==
The mass–energy density of the universe is 68% dark energy, 27% dark matter, and 5% ordinary matter. Other contents are neutrinos (less than 0.3%) and electromagnetic radiation (about 0.005%). The universe has 10 billion times more matter than antimatter. In the very early universe matter and antimatter annihilated each other leaving a high density of photons. In the Standard Model of particle physics, equal amounts antimatter and matter should have been created. The cause of this observed baryon asymmetry is not known.

The distribution of matter throughout the universe is highly variable. The average density is about 1 proton per 200 litres. Vast volumes of the universe are voids of exceptionally low density. The interstellar medium far from stars but within a galaxy has density of a few protons per litre.

The proportions of all types of matter and energy have changed over the history of the universe. The total amount of electromagnetic radiation generated within the universe has decreased by 1/2 in the past 2 billion years. Today, ordinary matter, which includes atoms, stars, galaxies, and life, accounts for only 4.9% of the contents of the universe. The present overall density of this type of matter is very low, roughly 4.5 × 10^{−31} grams per cubic centimeter, corresponding to a density of the order of only one proton for every four cubic meters of volume. The nature of both dark energy and dark matter is unknown. Dark matter, a mysterious form of matter that has not yet been identified, accounts for 26.8% of the cosmic contents. Dark energy, which is the energy of empty space and is causing the expansion of the universe to accelerate, accounts for the remaining 68.3% of the contents.

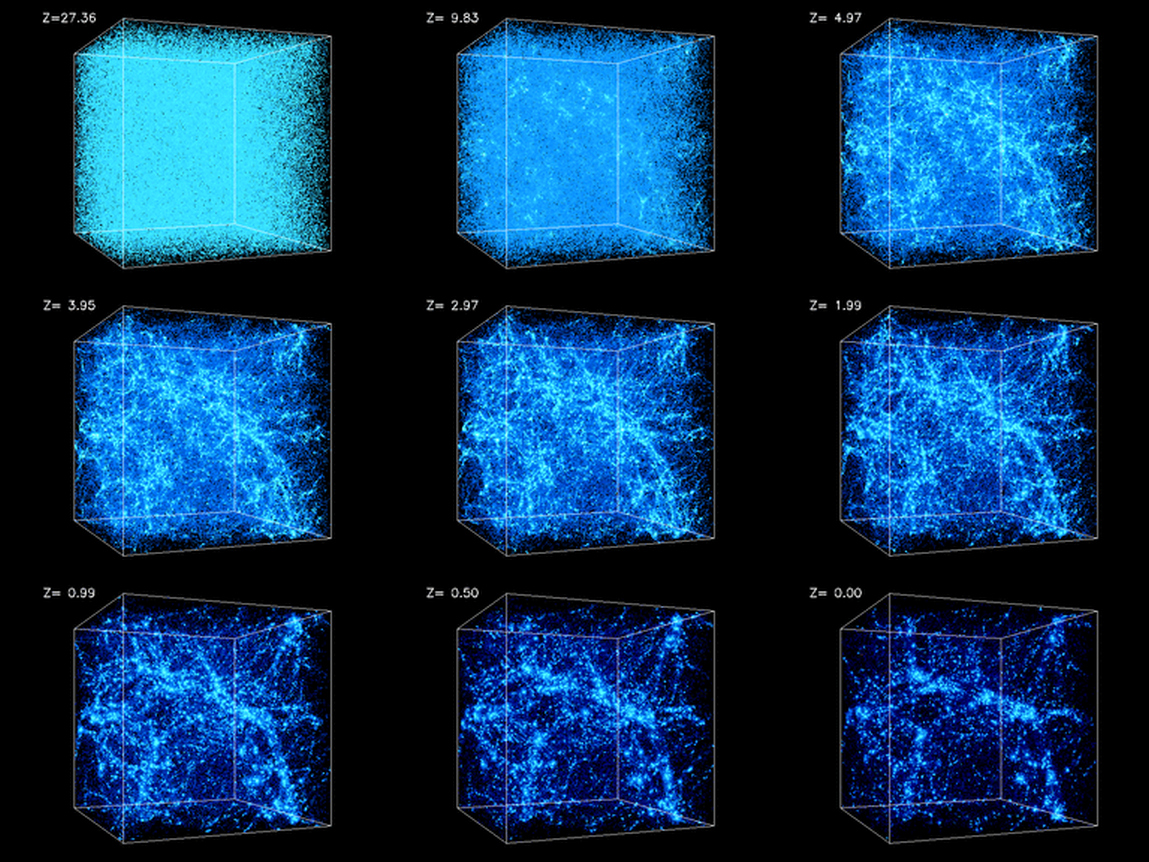
The formation of clusters and large-scale filaments in the cold dark matter model with dark energy. The frames show the evolution of structures in a 43 million parsecs (or 140 million light-years) box from redshift of 30 to the present epoch (upper left z=30 to lower right z=0).

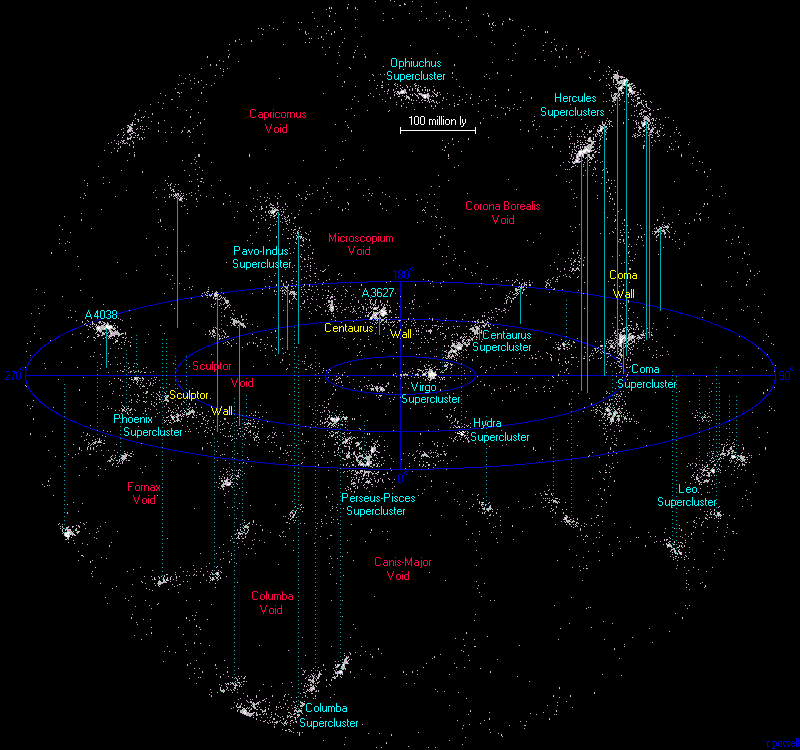
A map of the superclusters and voids nearest to Earth

Matter, dark matter, and dark energy are distributed homogeneously throughout the universe over length scales longer than 300 million light-years (ly) or so. However, over shorter length-scales, matter tends to clump hierarchically; many atoms are condensed into stars, most stars into galaxies, most galaxies into clusters, superclusters and, finally, large-scale galactic filaments. The observable universe contains as many as an estimated 2 trillion galaxies and, overall, as many as an estimated 10^{24} stars – more stars (and Earth-like planets) than all the grains of beach sand on planet Earth; but less than the total number of atoms estimated in the universe as 10^{82}; and the estimated total number of stars in an inflationary universe (observed and unobserved), as 10^{100}. Typical galaxies range from dwarfs with as few as ten million (10^{7}) stars up to giants with one trillion (10^{12}) stars. Between the larger structures are voids, which are typically 10–150 Mpc (33 million–490 million ly) in diameter. The Milky Way is in the Local Group of galaxies, which in turn is in the Laniakea Supercluster. This supercluster spans over 500 million light-years, while the Local Group spans over 10 million light-years. The universe also has vast regions of relative emptiness; the largest known void measures 1.8 billion ly (550 Mpc) across.

Comparison of the contents of the universe today to 380,000 years after the Big Bang, as measured with 5 year WMAP data (from 2008). Due to rounding, the sum of these numbers is not 100%.

The observable universe is isotropic on scales significantly larger than superclusters, meaning that the statistical properties of the universe are the same in all directions as observed from Earth. The universe is bathed in highly isotropic microwave radiation that corresponds to a thermal equilibrium blackbody spectrum of roughly 2.72548 kelvins. The hypothesis that the large-scale universe is homogeneous and isotropic is known as the cosmological principle. A universe that is both homogeneous and isotropic looks the same from all vantage points and has no center.

=== Dark energy ===
An explanation for why the expansion of the universe is accelerating remains elusive. It is often attributed to the gravitational influence of "dark energy", an unknown form of energy that is hypothesized to permeate space. On a mass–energy equivalence basis, the density of dark energy (~ 7 × 10^{−30} g/cm^{3}) is much less than the density of ordinary matter or dark matter within galaxies. However, in the present dark-energy era, it dominates the mass–energy of the universe because it is uniform across space.

Two proposed forms for dark energy are the cosmological constant, a constant energy density filling space homogeneously, and scalar fields such as quintessence or moduli, dynamic quantities whose energy density can vary in time and space while still permeating them enough to cause the observed rate of expansion. Contributions from scalar fields that are constant in space are usually also included in the cosmological constant. The cosmological constant can be formulated to be equivalent to vacuum energy.

=== Dark matter ===
Dark matter is a hypothetical kind of matter that is invisible to the entire electromagnetic spectrum, but which accounts for most of the matter in the universe. The existence and properties of dark matter are inferred from its gravitational effects on visible matter, radiation, and the large-scale structure of the universe. Other than neutrinos, a form of hot dark matter, dark matter has not been detected directly, making it one of the greatest mysteries in modern astrophysics. Dark matter neither emits nor absorbs light or any other electromagnetic radiation at any significant level. Dark matter is estimated to constitute 26.8% of the total mass–energy and 84.5% of the total matter in the universe.

=== Ordinary matter ===
Masses and sizes of objects in the Universe

The remaining 4.9% of the mass–energy of the universe is ordinary matter, that is, atoms, ions, electrons and the objects they form. This matter includes stars, which produce nearly all of the light we see from galaxies, as well as interstellar gas in the interstellar and intergalactic media, planets, and all the objects from everyday life that we can bump into, touch or squeeze. The great majority of ordinary matter in the universe is unseen, since visible stars and gas inside galaxies and clusters account for less than 10 percent of the ordinary matter contribution to the mass–energy density of the universe.

Ordinary matter commonly exists in four states (or phases): solid, liquid, gas, and plasma. However, advances in experimental techniques have revealed other previously theoretical phases, such as Bose–Einstein condensates and fermionic condensates. Ordinary matter is composed of two types of elementary particles: quarks and leptons. For example, the proton is formed of two up quarks and one down quark; the neutron is formed of two down quarks and one up quark; and the electron is a kind of lepton. An atom consists of an atomic nucleus, made up of protons and neutrons (both of which are baryons), and electrons that orbit the nucleus.

Soon after the Big Bang, primordial protons and neutrons formed from the quark–gluon plasma of the early universe as it cooled below two trillion degrees. A few minutes later, in a process known as Big Bang nucleosynthesis, nuclei formed from the primordial protons and neutrons. This nucleosynthesis formed lighter elements, those with small atomic numbers up to lithium and beryllium, but the abundance of heavier elements dropped off sharply with increasing atomic number. Some boron may have been formed at this time, but the next heavier element, carbon, was not formed in significant amounts. Big Bang nucleosynthesis shut down after about 20 minutes due to the rapid drop in temperature and density of the expanding universe. Subsequent formation of heavier elements resulted from stellar nucleosynthesis and supernova nucleosynthesis.

=== Particles ===
Standard Model of elementary particles: the 12 fundamental fermions and 4 fundamental bosons. Brown loops indicate which bosons (red) couple to which fermions (purple and green). Columns are three generations of matter (fermions) and one of forces (bosons). In the first three columns, two rows contain quarks and two leptons. The top two rows' columns contain up (u) and down (d) quarks, charm (c) and strange (s) quarks, top (t) and bottom (b) quarks, and photon (γ) and gluon (g), respectively. The bottom two rows' columns contain electron neutrino (ν_{e}) and electron (e), muon neutrino (ν_{μ}) and muon (μ), tau neutrino (ν_{τ}) and tau (τ), and the Z^{0} and W^{±} carriers of the weak force. Mass, charge, and spin are listed for each particle.

Ordinary matter and the forces that act on matter can be described in terms of elementary particles. These particles are sometimes regarded as fundamental because they have no known substructure. In most contemporary models they are thought of as points in space. All elementary particles are described by quantum mechanics and exhibit wave–particle duality: their behavior has both particle-like and wave-like aspects manifest under different circumstances.

Of central importance is the Standard Model, a theory that is concerned with electromagnetic interactions and the weak and strong nuclear interactions. The Standard Model is supported by the experimental confirmation of the existence of particles that compose matter: quarks and leptons, and their corresponding "antimatter" duals, as well as the force particles that mediate interactions: the photon, the W and Z bosons, and the gluon. The Standard Model predicted the existence of the recently discovered Higgs boson, a particle that is a manifestation of a field within the universe that can endow particles with mass. Because of its success in explaining a wide variety of experimental results, the Standard Model is sometimes regarded as a "theory of almost everything". The Standard Model does not, however, accommodate gravity. A true force–particle "theory of everything" has not been attained.

==== Hadrons ====
A hadron is a composite particle made of quarks held together by the strong force. Hadrons are categorized into two families: baryons (such as protons and neutrons) made of three quarks, and mesons (such as pions) made of one quark and one antiquark. Of the hadrons, protons are stable, and neutrons bound within atomic nuclei are stable. Other hadrons are unstable under ordinary conditions and are thus insignificant constituents of the modern universe.

From approximately 10^{−6} seconds after the Big Bang, during a period known as the hadron epoch, the temperature of the universe had fallen sufficiently to allow quarks to bind together into hadrons, and the mass of the universe was dominated by hadrons. Initially, the temperature was high enough to allow the formation of hadron–anti-hadron pairs, which kept matter and antimatter in thermal equilibrium. However, as the temperature of the universe continued to fall, hadron–anti-hadron pairs were no longer produced. Most of the hadrons and anti-hadrons were then eliminated in particle–antiparticle annihilation reactions, leaving a small residual of hadrons by the time the universe was about one second old.

==== Leptons ====
A lepton is an elementary, half-integer spin particle that does not undergo strong interactions but is subject to the Pauli exclusion principle; no two leptons of the same species can be in exactly the same state at the same time. Two main classes of leptons exist: charged leptons (also known as the electron-like leptons), and neutral leptons (better known as neutrinos). Electrons are stable and the most common charged lepton in the universe, whereas muons and taus are unstable particles that quickly decay after being produced in high energy collisions, such as those involving cosmic rays or carried out in particle accelerators. Charged leptons can combine with other particles to form various composite particles such as atoms and positronium. The electron governs nearly all of chemistry, as it is found in atoms and is directly tied to all chemical properties. Neutrinos rarely interact with anything, and are consequently rarely observed. Neutrinos stream throughout the universe but rarely interact with normal matter.

The lepton epoch was the period in the evolution of the early universe in which the leptons dominated the mass of the universe. It started roughly 1 second after the Big Bang, after the majority of hadrons and anti-hadrons annihilated each other at the end of the hadron epoch. During the lepton epoch, the temperature of the universe was still high enough to create lepton–anti-lepton pairs, so leptons and anti-leptons were in thermal equilibrium. Approximately 10 seconds after the Big Bang, the temperature of the universe had fallen to the point where lepton–anti-lepton pairs were no longer created. Most leptons and anti-leptons were then eliminated in annihilation reactions, leaving a small residue of leptons. The mass of the universe was then dominated by photons as it entered the following photon epoch.

==== Photons ====
A photon is the quantum of light and all other forms of electromagnetic radiation. It is the carrier for the electromagnetic force. The effects of this force are easily observable at the microscopic and at the macroscopic level because the photon has zero rest mass; this allows long distance interactions.

The photon epoch started after most leptons and anti-leptons were annihilated at the end of the lepton epoch, about 10 seconds after the Big Bang. Atomic nuclei were created in the process of nucleosynthesis which occurred during the first few minutes of the photon epoch. For the remainder of the photon epoch the universe contained a hot dense plasma of nuclei, electrons and photons. About 380,000 years after the Big Bang, the temperature of the universe fell to the point where nuclei could combine with electrons to create neutral atoms. As a result, photons no longer interacted frequently with matter and the universe became transparent. The highly redshifted photons from this period form the cosmic microwave background. Tiny variations in the temperature of the CMB correspond to variations in the density of the universe that were the early "seeds" from which all subsequent structure formation took place.

== Cosmological models ==
=== Model of the universe based on general relativity ===
General relativity is the geometric theory of gravitation formulated by Albert Einstein in 1915 and remains the standard description of gravity in modern physics. It extends special relativity and Newton's law of universal gravitation by describing gravity as a manifestation of the curvature of space and time (spacetime). In this framework, the curvature of spacetime is determined by the energy and momentum of matter and radiation.

This relationship is expressed through the Einstein field equations, which link the distribution of matter and energy to the geometry of spacetime. The resulting geometry governs the motion of matter, so that solutions of these equations describe how the universe evolves over time.

Under the cosmological principle, which assumes that the universe is homogeneous and isotropic on large scales, the field equations admit a class of solutions described by the metric tensor known as the Friedmann–Lemaître–Robertson–Walker metric. In this description, the universe is characterized by two quantities: a scale factor, which describes how its overall size changes with time, and a curvature index, which specifies its spatial geometry. The curvature can be flat, positively curved, or negatively curved.

The evolution of the scale factor depends on both the spatial curvature and the cosmological constant, which represents the energy density of empty space and may be associated with dark energy. The relation governing this evolution is known as the Friedmann equation, introduced by Alexander Friedmann.

The curvature determines the global geometry of space. A positively curved universe has a finite volume and can be visualized as a three-dimensional sphere. A flat or negatively curved universe is spatially infinite. Although this may seem counterintuitive, models with flat or negative curvature allow an infinite universe to emerge from an initial state in which the scale factor vanishes, consistent with the cosmological principle. Analogies include an infinite plane (flat) or other geometries such as a torus.

The ultimate fate of the universe depends on both the curvature and the cosmological constant. A sufficiently dense universe with positive curvature would eventually recollapse in a Big Crunch, possibly followed by a Big Bounce. In contrast, a flat or negatively curved universe would expand indefinitely, approaching a Big Freeze and eventual heat death of the universe. Observations indicate that the expansion of the universe is accelerating, raising the possibility of a Big Rip. Current data suggest that the universe is close to flat, with a density near the critical value separating recollapse from eternal expansion.

=== Multiverse hypotheses ===
Some speculative theories have proposed that our universe is but one of a set of disconnected universes, collectively denoted as the multiverse. An easily visualized metaphor of these concepts is a group of separate soap bubbles, in which observers living on one soap bubble cannot interact with those on other soap bubbles, even in principle. According to one common terminology, each "soap bubble" of spacetime is denoted as a universe, whereas humans' particular spacetime is denoted as the universe, just as humans call Earth's moon the Moon. The entire collection of these separate spacetimes is denoted as the multiverse.

Max Tegmark and Brian Greene have proposed different classification schemes for multiverse ideas. In Tegmark's scheme multiverses might result from the immense size of the spacetime, from cosmological processes that produce spacetime bubbles, from quantum mechanical unitarity, or because we live in a mathematical construct. If space is infinite, or sufficiently large and uniform, identical instances of the history of Earth's entire Hubble volume occur every so often, simply by chance. Tegmark calculated that our nearest so-called doppelgänger is 10^{10^{115}} metres away from us (a double exponential function larger than a googolplex). The physical basis of these ideas have been challenged.

== Historical conceptions ==
Historically, there have been many ideas of the cosmos (cosmologies) and its origin (cosmogonies). Theories of an impersonal universe governed by physical laws were first proposed by the Greeks and Indians. Ancient Chinese philosophy encompassed the notion of the universe including both all of space and all of time. Over the centuries, improvements in astronomical observations and theories of motion and gravitation led to ever more accurate descriptions of the universe. The modern era of cosmology began with Albert Einstein's 1915 general theory of relativity, which made it possible to quantitatively predict the origin, evolution, and conclusion of the universe as a whole. Most modern, accepted theories of cosmology are based on general relativity and, more specifically, the predicted Big Bang.

=== Mythologies ===
Many cultures have stories describing the origin of the world and universe. Cultures generally regard these stories as having some truth. There are however many differing beliefs in how these stories apply amongst those believing in a supernatural origin, ranging from a god directly creating the universe as it is now to a god just setting the "wheels in motion" (for example via mechanisms such as the big bang and evolution).

Ethnologists and anthropologists who study myths have developed various classification schemes for the various themes that appear in creation stories. For example, in one type of story, the world is born from a world egg; such stories include the Finnish epic poem Kalevala, the Chinese story of Pangu or the Indian Brahmanda Purana. In related stories, the universe is created by a single entity emanating or producing something by him- or herself, as in the Tibetan Buddhism concept of Adi-Buddha, the ancient Greek story of Gaia (Mother Earth), the Aztec goddess Coatlicue myth, the ancient Egyptian god Atum story, and the Judeo-Christian Genesis creation narrative in which the Abrahamic God created the universe. In another type of story, the universe is created from the union of male and female deities, as in the Māori story of Rangi and Papa. In other stories, the universe is created by crafting it from pre-existing materials, such as the corpse of a dead god—as from Tiamat in the Babylonian epic Enuma Elish or from the giant Ymir in Norse mythology—or from chaotic materials, as in Izanagi and Izanami in Japanese mythology. In other stories, the universe emanates from fundamental principles, such as Brahman and Prakrti, and the creation myth of the Serers.

=== Philosophical models ===
The pre-Socratic Greek philosophers and Indian philosophers developed some of the earliest philosophical concepts of the universe. The earliest Greek philosophers noted that appearances can be deceiving, and sought to understand the underlying reality behind the appearances. In particular, they noted the ability of matter to change forms (e.g., ice to water to steam) and several philosophers proposed that all the physical materials in the world are different forms of a single primordial material, or arche. The first to do so was Thales, who proposed this material to be water. Thales' student, Anaximander, proposed that everything came from the limitless apeiron. Anaximenes proposed the primordial material to be air on account of its perceived attractive and repulsive qualities that cause the arche to condense or dissociate into different forms. Anaxagoras proposed the principle of Nous (Mind), while Heraclitus proposed fire (and spoke of logos). Empedocles proposed the elements to be earth, water, air and fire. His four-element model became very popular. Like Pythagoras, Plato believed that all things were composed of number, with Empedocles' elements taking the form of the Platonic solids. Democritus, and later philosophers—most notably Leucippus—proposed that the universe is composed of indivisible atoms moving through a void (vacuum), although Aristotle did not believe that to be feasible because air, like water, offers resistance to motion. Air will immediately rush in to fill a void, and moreover, without resistance, it would do so indefinitely fast.

Although Heraclitus argued for eternal change, his contemporary Parmenides emphasized changelessness. Parmenides' poem On Nature has been read as saying that all change is an illusion, that the true underlying reality is eternally unchanging and of a single nature, or at least that the essential feature of each thing that exists must exist eternally, without origin, change, or end. His student Zeno of Elea challenged everyday ideas about motion with several famous paradoxes. Aristotle responded to these paradoxes by developing the notion of a potential countable infinity, as well as the infinitely divisible continuum.

The Indian philosopher Kanada, founder of the Vaisheshika school, developed a notion of atomism and proposed that light and heat were varieties of the same substance. In the 5th century AD, the Buddhist atomist philosopher Dignāga proposed atoms to be point-sized, durationless, and made of energy. They denied the existence of substantial matter and proposed that movement consisted of momentary flashes of a stream of energy.

The notion of temporal finitism was inspired by the doctrine of creation shared by the three Abrahamic religions: Judaism, Christianity and Islam. The Christian philosopher, John Philoponus, presented the philosophical arguments against the ancient Greek notion of an infinite past and future. Philoponus' arguments against an infinite past were used by the early Muslim philosopher, Al-Kindi (Alkindus); the Jewish philosopher, Saadia Gaon (Saadia ben Joseph); and the Muslim theologian, Al-Ghazali (Algazel).

Pantheism is the philosophical religious belief that the universe itself is identical to divinity and a supreme being or entity. The physical universe is thus understood as an all-encompassing, immanent deity. The term 'pantheist' designates one who holds both that everything constitutes a unity and that this unity is divine, consisting of an all-encompassing, manifested god or goddess.

=== Astronomical concepts ===
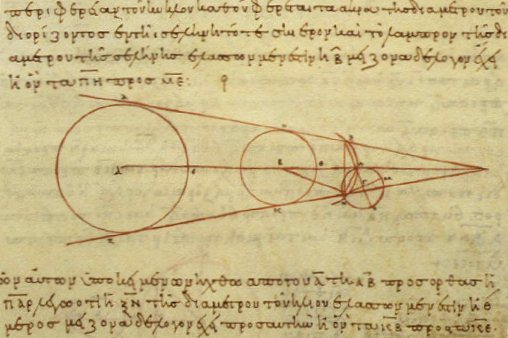
3rd century BCE calculations by Aristarchus on the relative sizes of, from left to right, the Sun, Earth, and Moon, from a 10th-century AD Greek copy

The earliest written records of identifiable predecessors to modern astronomy come from Ancient Egypt and Mesopotamia from around 3000 to 1200 BCE. Babylonian astronomers of the 7th century BCE viewed the world as a flat disk surrounded by the ocean.

Later Greek philosophers, observing the motions of the heavenly bodies, were concerned with developing models of the universe based more profoundly on empirical evidence. Some of the earliest cosmological models of the universe were developed by ancient Greek and Indian philosophers and were geocentric, placing Earth at the center. The first coherent model was proposed by Eudoxus of Cnidos, a student of Plato who followed Plato's idea that heavenly motions had to be circular. In order to account for the known complications of the planets' motions, particularly retrograde movement, Eudoxus' model included 27 different celestial spheres: four for each of the planets visible to the naked eye, three each for the Sun and the Moon, and one for the stars. All of these spheres were centered on the Earth, which remained motionless while they rotated eternally. Aristotle elaborated upon this model, increasing the number of spheres to 55 in order to account for further details of planetary motion. For Aristotle, normal matter was entirely contained within the terrestrial sphere, and it obeyed fundamentally different rules from heavenly material.

The post-Aristotle treatise De Mundo (of uncertain authorship and date) stated, "Five elements, situated in spheres in five regions, the less being in each case surrounded by the greater—namely, earth surrounded by water, water by air, air by fire, and fire by ether—make up the whole universe". This model was also refined by Callippus and after concentric spheres were abandoned, it was brought into nearly perfect agreement with astronomical observations by Ptolemy. The success of such a model is largely due to the mathematical fact that any function (such as the position of a planet) can be decomposed into a set of circular functions (the Fourier modes). Other Greek scientists, such as the Pythagorean philosopher Philolaus, postulated (according to Stobaeus' account) that at the center of the universe was a "central fire" around which the Earth, Sun, Moon and planets revolved in uniform circular motion.

The Greek astronomer Aristarchus of Samos was the first known individual to propose a heliocentric model of the universe. Though the original text has been lost, a reference in Archimedes' book The Sand Reckoner describes Aristarchus's heliocentric model. Archimedes wrote:

You, King Gelon, are aware the universe is the name given by most astronomers to the sphere the center of which is the center of the Earth, while its radius is equal to the straight line between the center of the Sun and the center of the Earth. This is the common account as you have heard from astronomers. But Aristarchus has brought out a book consisting of certain hypotheses, wherein it appears, as a consequence of the assumptions made, that the universe is many times greater than the universe just mentioned. His hypotheses are that the fixed stars and the Sun remain unmoved, that the Earth revolves about the Sun on the circumference of a circle, the Sun lying in the middle of the orbit, and that the sphere of fixed stars, situated about the same center as the Sun, is so great that the circle in which he supposes the Earth to revolve bears such a proportion to the distance of the fixed stars as the center of the sphere bears to its surface.

Aristarchus thus believed the stars to be very far away, and saw this as the reason why stellar parallax had not been observed, that is, the stars had not been observed to move relative each other as the Earth moved around the Sun. The stars are in fact much farther away than the distance that was generally assumed in ancient times, which is why stellar parallax is only detectable with precision instruments. The geocentric model, consistent with planetary parallax, was assumed to be the explanation for the unobservability of stellar parallax.

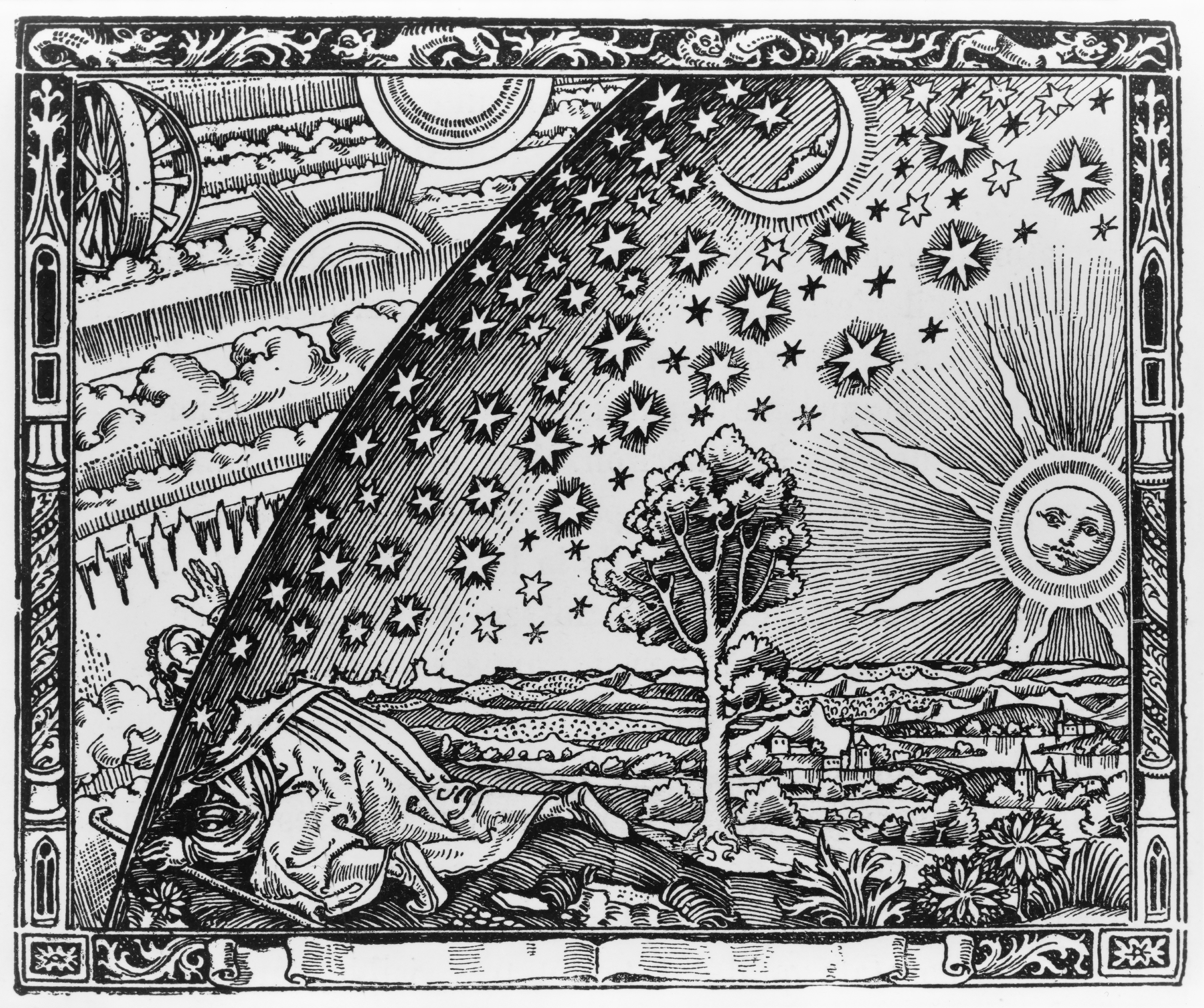
Flammarion engraving, Paris 1888

The only other astronomer from antiquity known by name who supported Aristarchus's heliocentric model was Seleucus of Seleucia, a Hellenistic astronomer who lived a century after Aristarchus. According to Plutarch, Seleucus was the first to prove the heliocentric system through reasoning, but it is not known what arguments he used. Seleucus' arguments for a heliocentric cosmology were probably related to the phenomenon of tides. According to Strabo (1.1.9), Seleucus was the first to state that the tides are due to the attraction of the Moon, and that the height of the tides depends on the Moon's position relative to the Sun. Alternatively, he may have proved heliocentricity by determining the constants of a geometric model for it, and by developing methods to compute planetary positions using this model, similar to Nicolaus Copernicus in the 16th century. During the Middle Ages, heliocentric models were also proposed by the Persian astronomers Albumasar and Al-Sijzi.

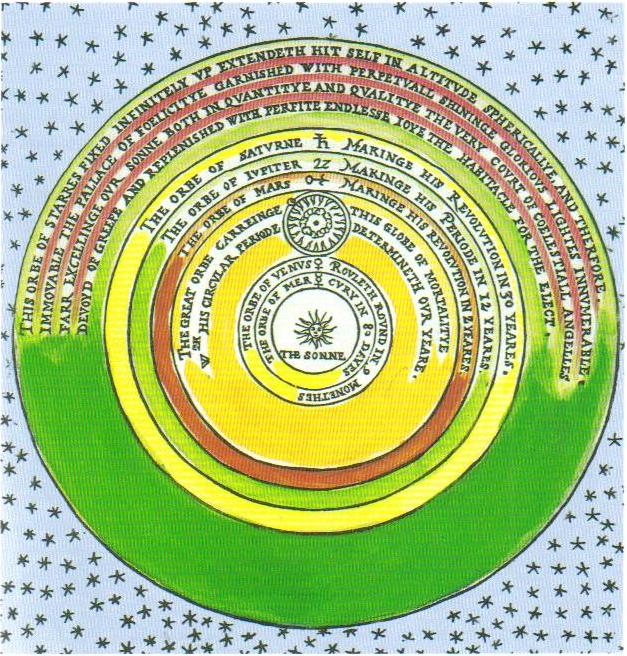
Model of the Copernican Universe by Thomas Digges in 1576, with the amendment that the stars are no longer confined to a sphere, but spread uniformly throughout the space surrounding the planets

The Aristotelian model was accepted in the Western world for roughly two millennia, until Copernicus revived Aristarchus's perspective that the astronomical data could be explained more plausibly if the Earth rotated on its axis and if the Sun were placed at the center of the universe.

In the center rests the Sun. For who would place this lamp of a very beautiful temple in another or better place than this wherefrom it can illuminate everything at the same time?

— Nicolaus Copernicus, in Chapter 10, Book 1 of De Revolutionibus Orbium Coelestrum (1543)

As noted by Copernicus, the notion that the Earth rotates is very old, dating at least to Philolaus (c. 450 BC), Heraclides Ponticus (c. 350 BC) and Ecphantus the Pythagorean. Roughly a century before Copernicus, the Christian scholar Nicholas of Cusa also proposed that the Earth rotates on its axis in his book, On Learned Ignorance (1440). Al-Sijzi also proposed that the Earth rotates on its axis. Empirical evidence for the Earth's rotation on its axis, using the phenomenon of comets, was given by Tusi (1201–1274) and Ali Qushji (1403–1474).

This cosmology was accepted by Isaac Newton, Christiaan Huygens and later scientists. Newton demonstrated that the same laws of motion and gravity apply to earthly and to celestial matter, making Aristotle's division between the two obsolete. Edmund Halley (1720) and Jean-Philippe de Chéseaux (1744) noted independently that the assumption of an infinite space filled uniformly with stars would lead to the prediction that the nighttime sky would be as bright as the Sun itself; this became known as Olbers' paradox in the 19th century. Newton believed that an infinite space uniformly filled with matter would cause infinite forces and instabilities causing the matter to be crushed inwards under its own gravity. This instability was clarified in 1902 by the Jeans instability criterion. One solution to these paradoxes is the Charlier universe, in which the matter is arranged hierarchically (systems of orbiting bodies that are themselves orbiting in a larger system, ad infinitum) in a fractal way such that the universe has a negligibly small overall density; such a cosmological model had also been proposed earlier in 1761 by Johann Heinrich Lambert.

=== Deep space astronomy ===
During the 18th century, Immanuel Kant speculated that nebulae could be entire galaxies separate from the Milky Way, and in 1850, Alexander von Humboldt called these separate galaxies Weltinseln, or "world islands", a term that later developed into "island universes". In 1919, when the Hooker Telescope was completed, the prevailing view was that the universe consisted entirely of the Milky Way Galaxy. Using the Hooker Telescope, Edwin Hubble identified Cepheid variables in several spiral nebulae and in 1922–1923 proved conclusively that Andromeda Nebula and Triangulum among others, were entire galaxies outside our own, thus proving that the universe consists of a multitude of galaxies. With this Hubble formulated the Hubble constant, which allowed for the first time a calculation of the age of the universe and size of the observable Universe, which became increasingly precise with better measurements, starting at 2 billion years and 280 million light-years, until 2006 when data of the Hubble Space Telescope allowed a very accurate calculation of the age of the universe and size of the Observable Universe.

The modern era of physical cosmology began in 1917, when Albert Einstein first applied his general theory of relativity to model the structure and dynamics of the universe. The discoveries of this era, and the questions that remain unanswered, are outlined in the sections above.

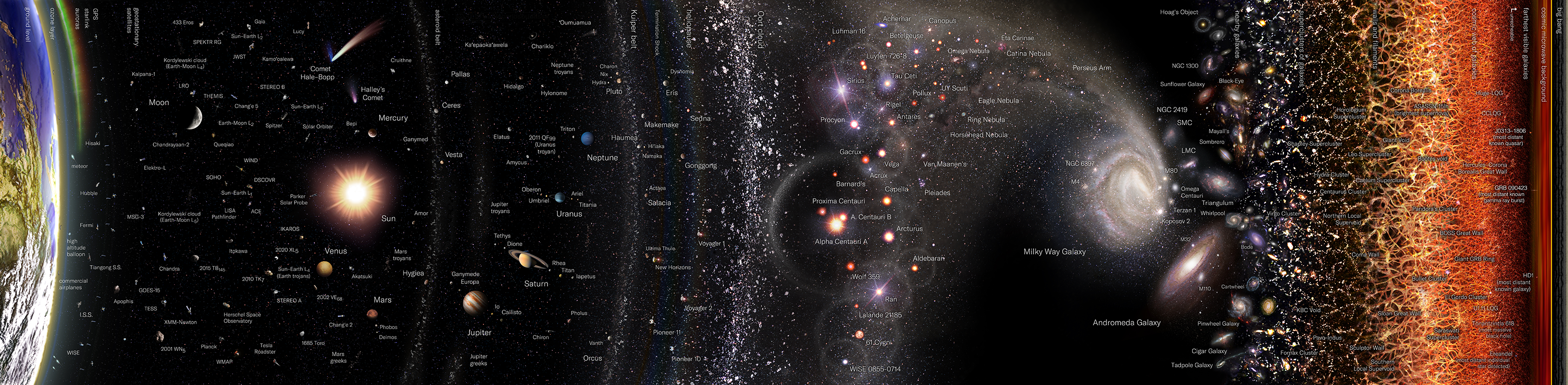
Map of the observable universe with some of the notable astronomical objects known as of 2018. The scale of length increases exponentially toward the right. Celestial bodies are shown enlarged in size to be able to understand their shapes.
Location of the Earth in the universe

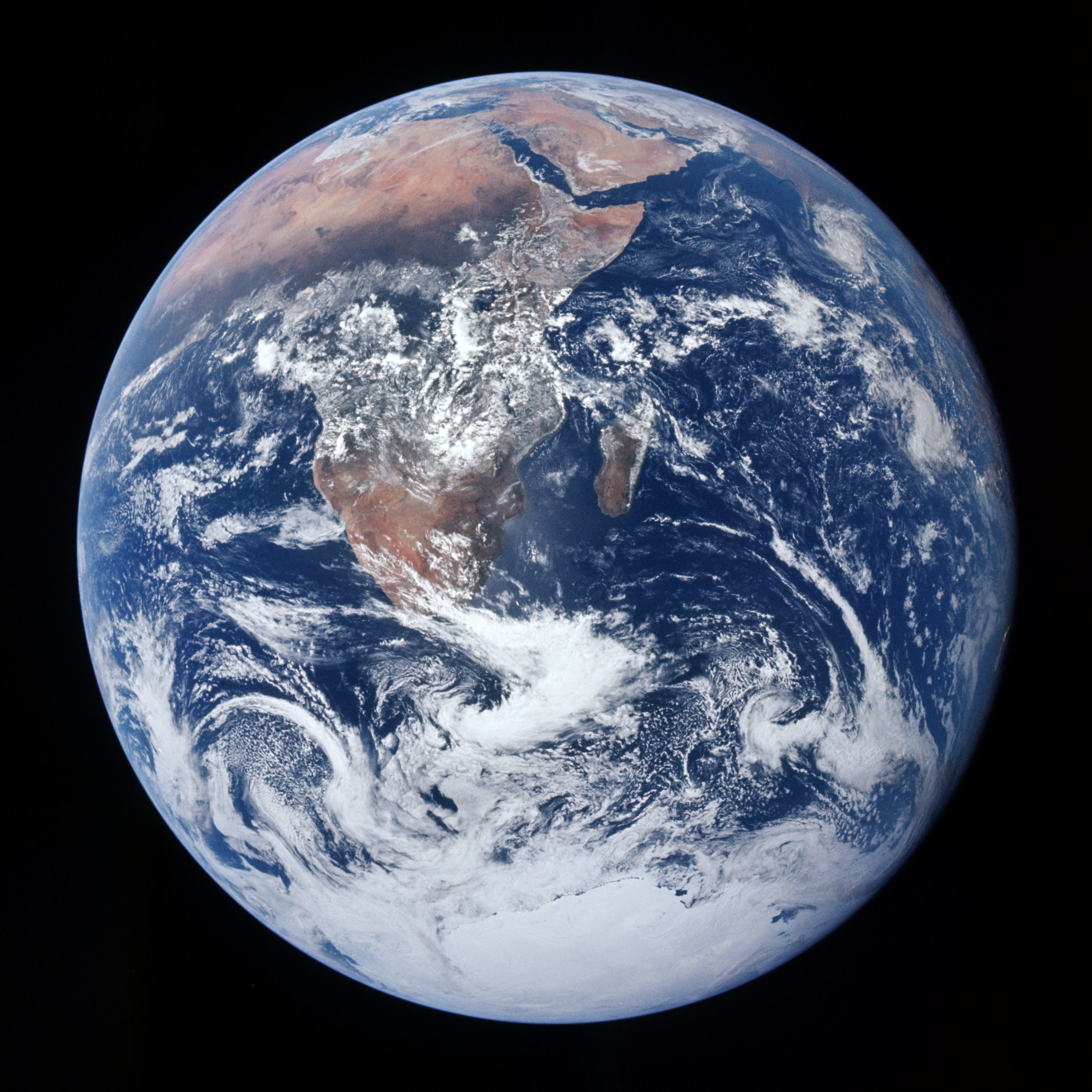
Earth

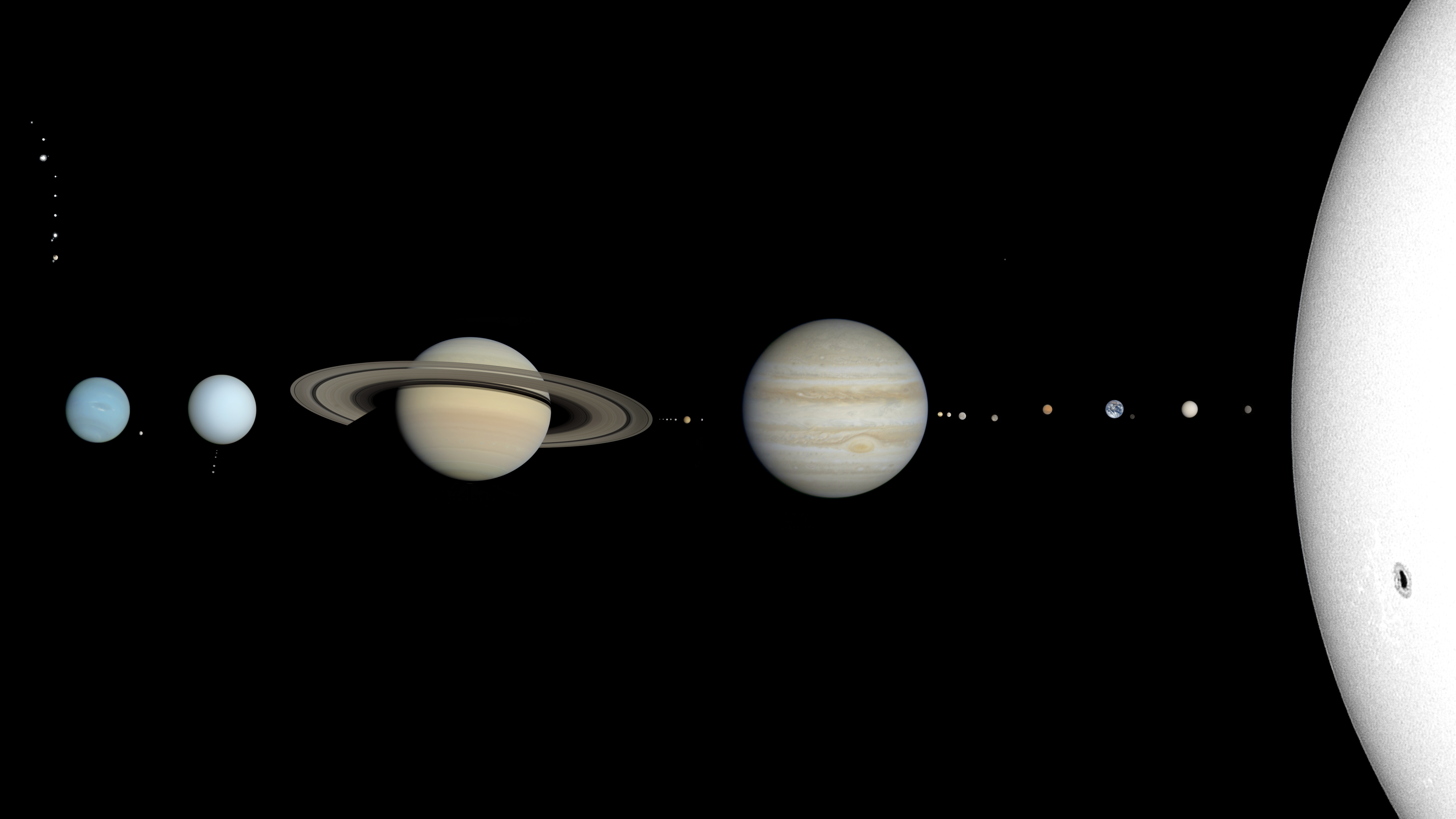
Solar System

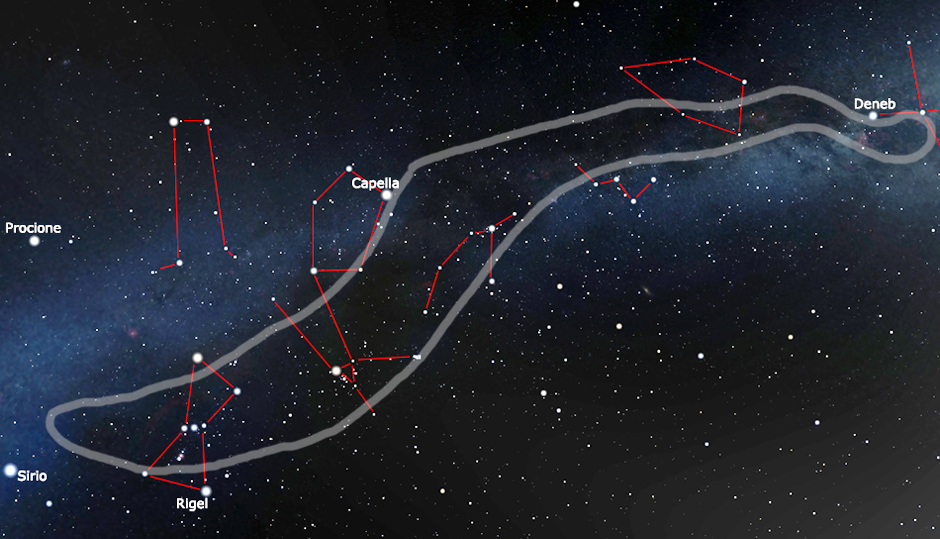
Radcliffe Wave

Orion Arm

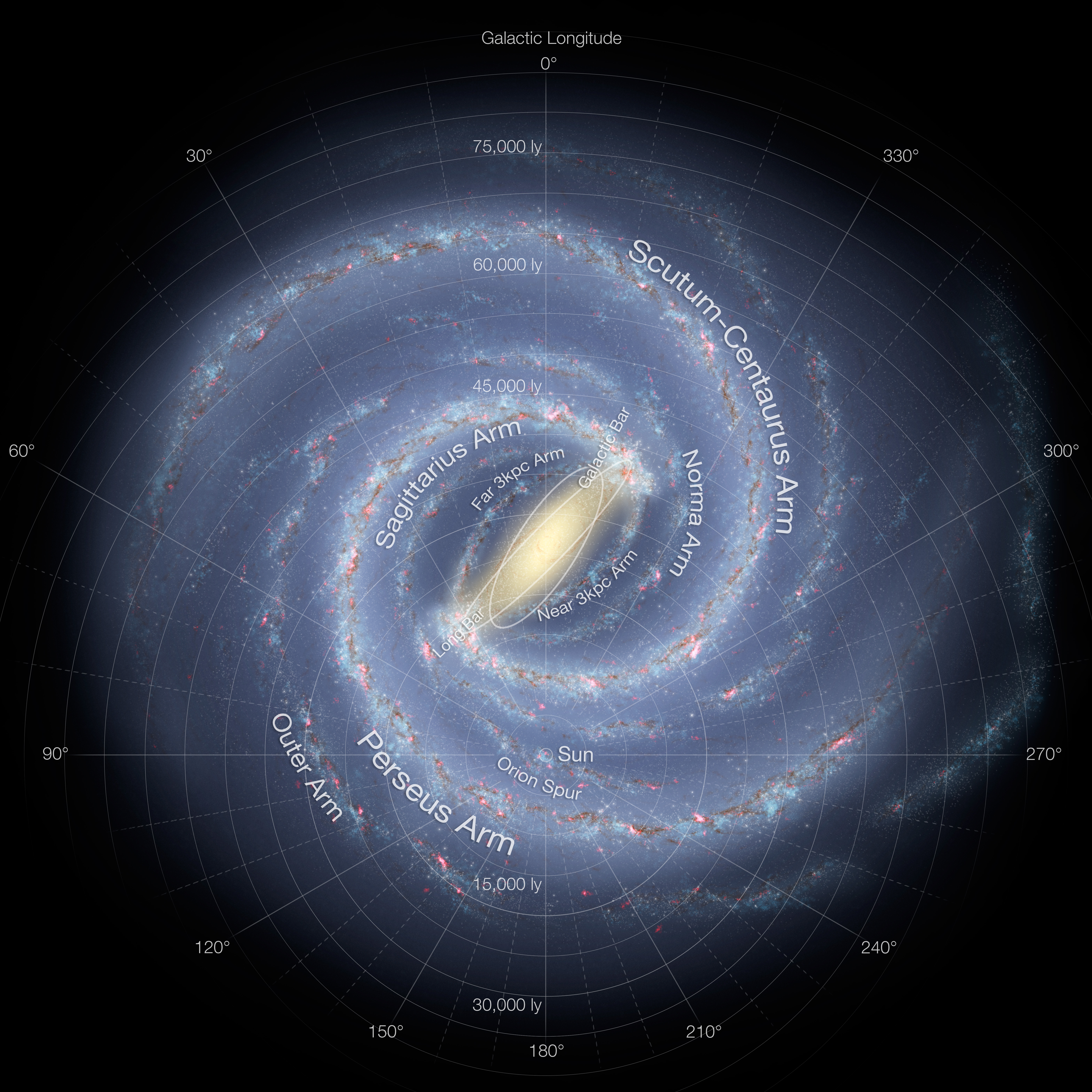
Milky Way

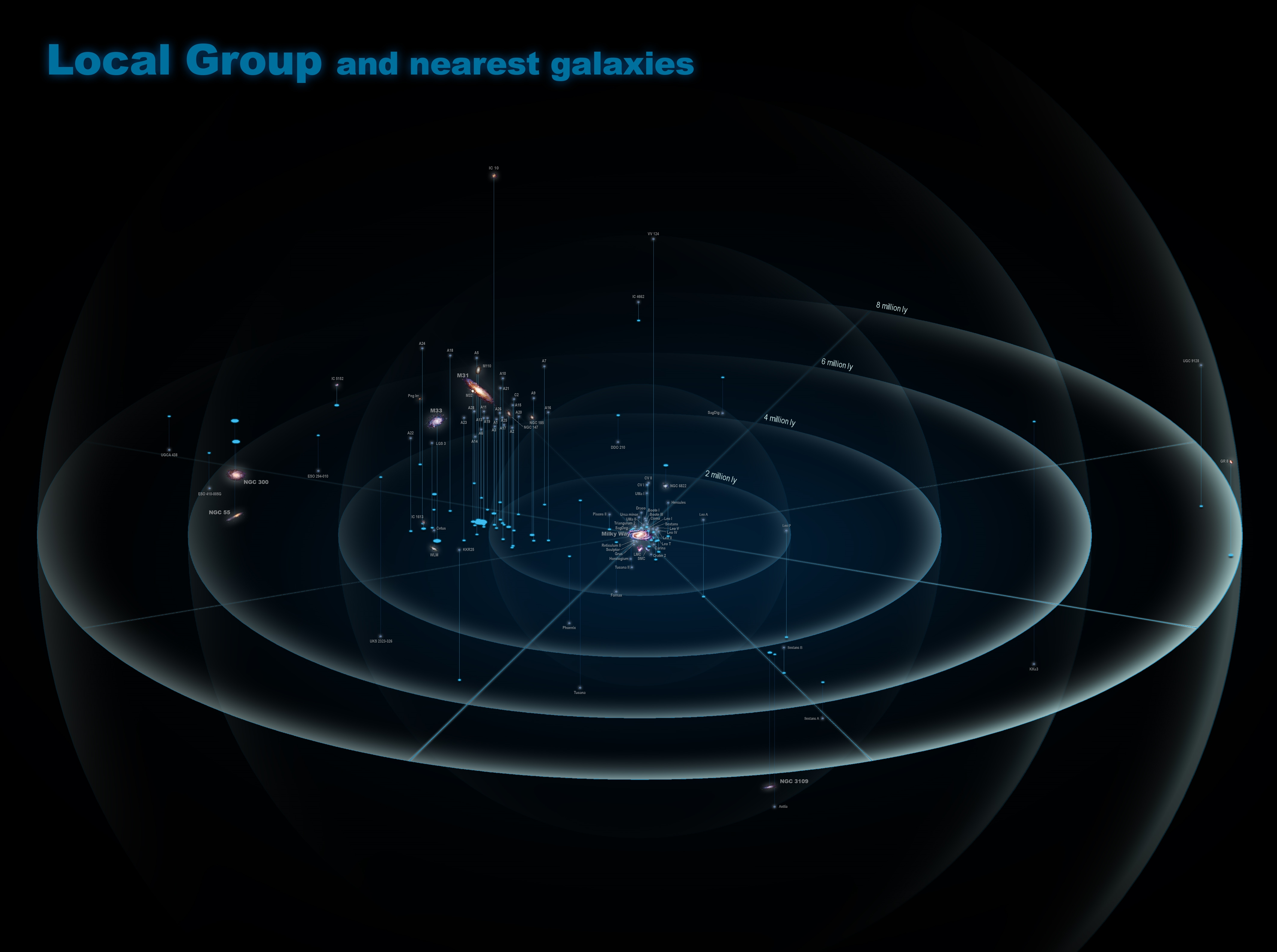
Local Group

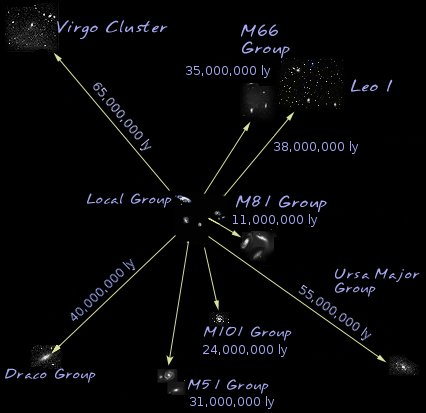
Virgo SCl

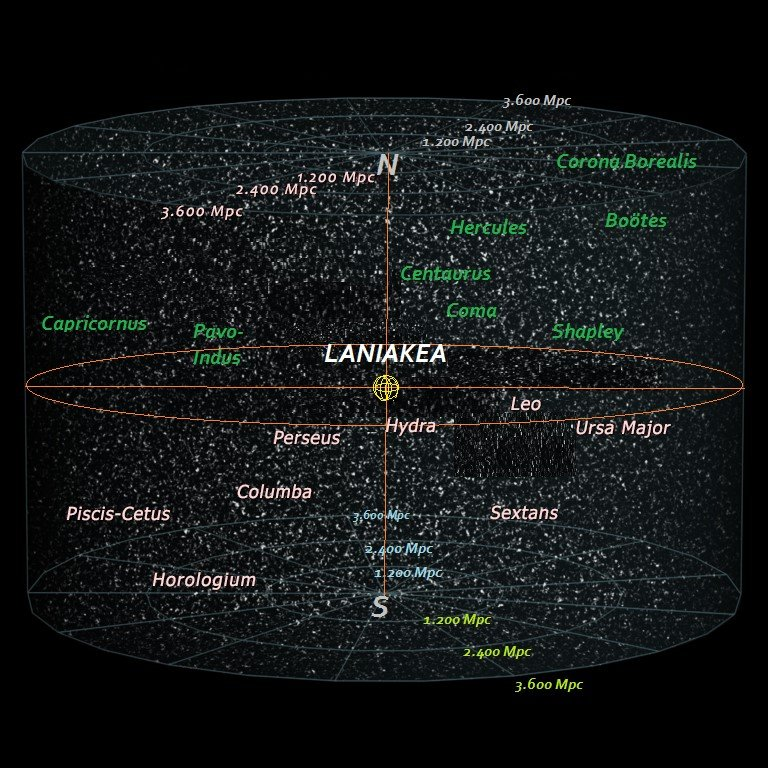
Laniakea SCl

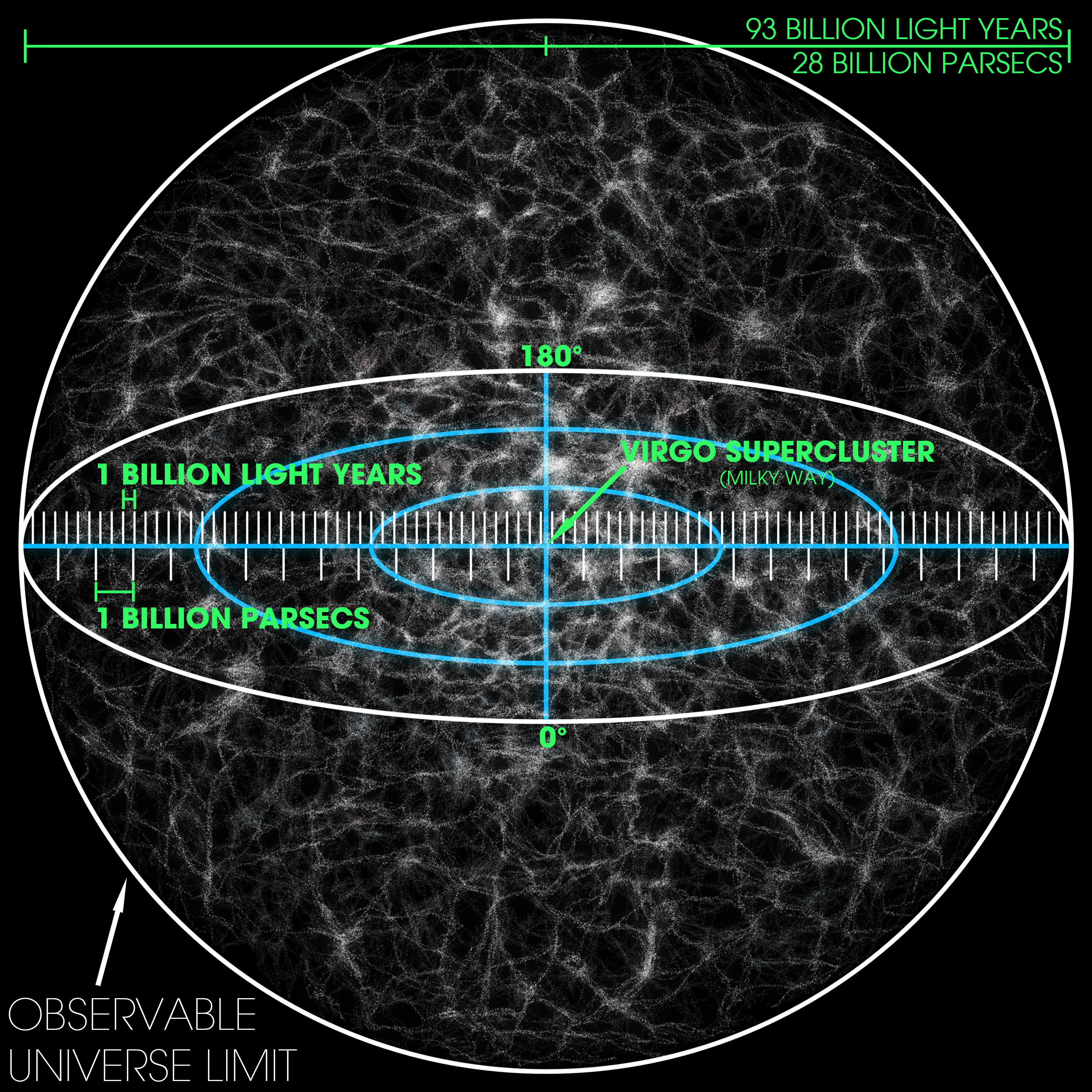
Observable universe

== See also ==
- Cosmic Calendar (scaled down timeline)
- Cosmic latte
- Earth's location in the universe
- False vacuum
- Future of an expanding universe
- Galaxy And Mass Assembly survey
- Heat death of the universe
- Center of the universe
- Illustris project
- Local (astronomy)
- Non-standard cosmology
- Nucleocosmochronology
- Parallel universe (fiction)
- Rare Earth hypothesis
- Space and survival
- Terasecond and longer
- Timeline of the early universe
- Timeline of the far future
- Timeline of the near future
- Zero-energy universe
