= Quark epoch =

Period in the evolution of the early universe

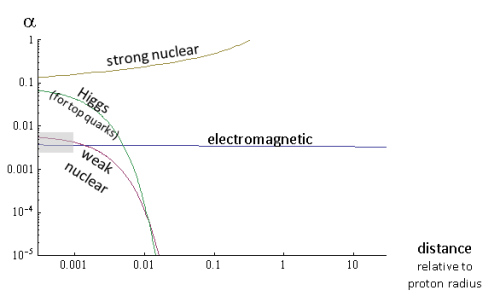
A visual representation of the division order of universal forces

In physical cosmology, the quark epoch was the period in the evolution of the early universe when the fundamental interactions of gravitation, electromagnetism, the strong interaction and the weak interaction had taken their present forms, but the temperature of the universe was still too high to allow quarks to bind together to form hadrons. The quark epoch began approximately 10^{−12} seconds after the Big Bang, when the preceding electroweak epoch ended as the electroweak interaction separated into the weak interaction and electromagnetism. During the quark epoch, the universe was filled with a dense, hot quark–gluon plasma, containing quarks, leptons and their antiparticles. Collisions between particles were too energetic to allow quarks to combine into mesons or baryons. The quark epoch ended when the universe was about 10^{−6} seconds old, when the average energy of particle interactions had fallen below the binding energy of hadrons. The following period, when quarks became confined within hadrons, is known as the hadron epoch.

== See also ==
- Chronology of the universe
- Cosmology
