= Electroweak epoch =

Period in the evolution of the early universe

In physical cosmology, the electroweak epoch was the period in the evolution of the early universe when the temperature of the universe had fallen enough that the strong force separated from the electronuclear interaction, but was still high enough for electromagnetism and the weak interaction to remain merged into a single electroweak interaction above the critical temperature for electroweak symmetry breaking (159.5±1.5 GeV in the Standard Model of particle physics). Some cosmologists place the electroweak epoch at the start of the inflationary epoch, approximately 10^{−36} seconds after the Big Bang. Others place it at approximately 10^{−32} seconds after the Big Bang, when the potential energy of the inflaton field that had driven the inflation of the universe during the inflationary epoch was released, filling the universe with a dense, hot quark–gluon plasma.

Particle interactions in this phase were energetic enough to create large numbers of exotic particles, including W and Z bosons and Higgs bosons. As the universe expanded and cooled, interactions became less energetic, and when the universe was about 10^{−12} seconds old, W and Z bosons ceased to be created at observable rates. The remaining W and Z bosons decayed quickly, and the weak interaction became a short-range force in the following quark epoch.

The electroweak epoch ended with an electroweak phase transition, the nature of which is unknown. Speculation in the 1990s that it may be a first order transition suggested it could source a gravitational wave background and a baryogenesis, provided the Sakharov conditions are satisfied and the Higgs boson energy was below 45 GeV.

Subsequent work with the Standard Model and a measurement of the Higgs boson as over 114 GeV, showed the transition during the electroweak epoch was not a first- or a second-order phase transition but a continuous crossover; with the actual Higgs mass of 125 GeV, the crossover width is approximately 5 GeV around the crossover temperature. In this case, there is no electroweak baryogenesis or production of an observable gravitational wave background peaking at the mHz range.

However, many extensions to the Standard Model including supersymmetry and the two-Higgs-doublet model have a first-order electroweak phase transition (but require additional CP violation).

== See also ==
- Chronology of the universe
