= Hadron era =

Period in the evolution of the early universe

In physical cosmology, the hadron era is a range of time in an obsolete model of the very early universe. It was said to have begun at a time of 10^{−44} seconds, or at 10^{−8} seconds, and ended at 10^{−4} seconds. The temperature was high enough to allow the formation of hadron/anti-hadron pairs, which kept matter and anti-matter in thermal equilibrium. After the discovery of quarks and gluons in the 1970s, the model based on hadrons no longer made sense.

However, hadron-antihadron pairs were only abundant for a brief time between about 5×10^{−5} seconds, the time of the QCD phase transition, and about 7×10^{−5} seconds, when the temperature of the universe dropped below the pion mass. Before the QCD phase transition, during the quark epoch, the universe was hot enough that quarks did not combine to form hadrons. At temperatures below the pion mass, most of the hadrons and anti-hadrons were eliminated in annihilation reactions, leaving the universe dominated by photons, neutrinos and electron-positron pairs. This subsequent period is referred to as the lepton era.

== See also ==
- Timeline of the early universe
- Chronology of the universe
- Big Bang
